= List of flags of the districts of Warsaw =

The flag of Warsaw.

Following article contains a list of current and historical flags used to represent the districts of the city of Warsaw, Poland, as well as its other historical subdivisions.

== Current flags ==
=== Białołęka ===
The flag of Białołęka, with the proportions of 5:8.

The flag of Białołęka, with the proportions of 15:28, de facto used by the district.

The flag of the Białołęka is divided horizontally into three stripes of the same width. They are, from top to bottom, light green, yellow, and red. The flag colours are inspired by the district coat of arms. The green colour symbolizes hope, happiness, and honour, yellow (golden) colour, nobleness, kindness, and intelligence, and the red colour, the bravery, and valor. The aspect ratio of the flag proportions, of its height to width, is 5:8. Despite that, the district also uses the flag with proportions of around 15:28. The flag was adopted on 28 April 1995 as the symbol of Gmina Warsaw-Białołęka, which was replaced by the district of Białołęka on 27 October 2002. Białołęka continues to use the flag to the present day.

=== Ursynów ===
The flag of Ursynów, with the proportions 100:99 as described in the establishing resolution.

The flag of the Ursynów, with the proportions of 5:8, de facto used by the municipality.

The flag of Ursynów is a divided into three horizontal stripes, that were, from the top to bottom, navy blue, yellow, and red. The yellow and red stripes reference the flag of Warsaw, while meaning behind the blue stripe is unknown. The aspect ratio of flag proportions, of its height to its width, is described in the establishing resolution as 100:99, although in practice, such proportions are not used. Instead, the flag is usually given a shape of a wider rectangle, with the proportions of 5:8. The proportion of the stripes to each other are described as equal 26:7:7, however, those proportion also remain unused in practice. Instead, the flag is usually presented with the blue stripe two times bigger than the remaining two stripes, with the proportion equal 2:1:1. The flag was adopted on 14 February 1995, as the symbol of Gmina Warsaw-Ursynów, which on 27 October 2002, was replaced by the district of Ursynów, which continues to use the flag present day.

== Former municipal flags (1994–2002) ==
In 1994, the city of Warsaw was divided into ten gminas (municipalities), which following their creation, begun establishing their symbols, including flags. Out of ten, six municipalities had adopted flag designs. They were: Warsaw-Bielany, Warsaw-Rembertów, Warsaw-Targówek, Warsaw-Ursus, Warsaw-Ursynów, and Warsaw-Wawer. The municipalities of Warsaw-Centre, and Warsaw-Wilanów did not adopt any flag design, while municipalities of Warsaw-Bemowo, and Warsaw-Włochy, stated in legal documents some bare descriptions of flag designs, which however were not intelligible, and such, not used. The municipalities existed until 27 October 2002, when they were replaced by the district. Most of them did not continue to use the flags of the predecessors, with the exception of a few of them.

=== Bemowo ===
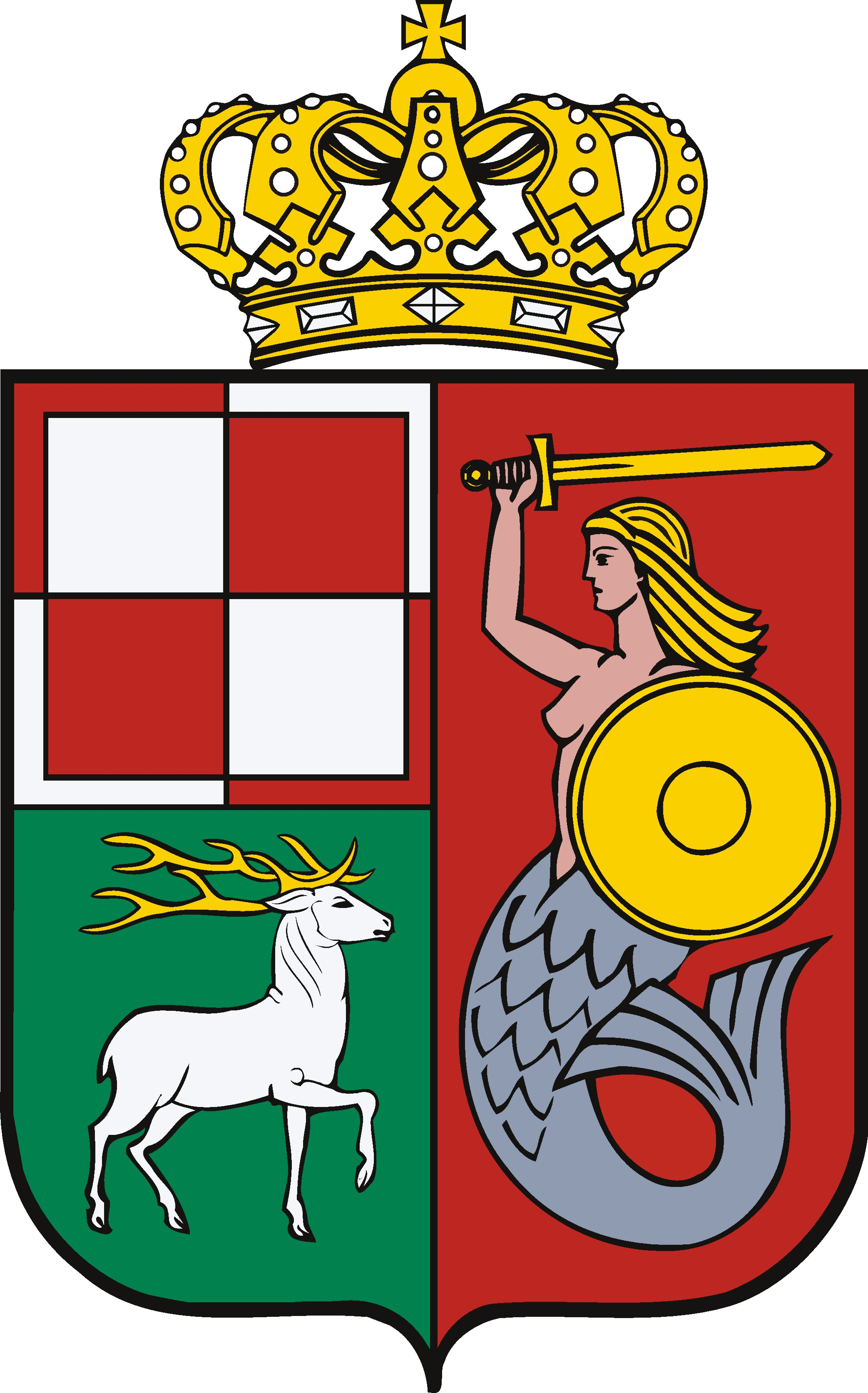
The coat of arms of Gmina Warsaw-Bemowo.

The Gmina Warsaw-Bemowo never had its own flag. However, the resolution from 11 January 1996 establishing the municipal coat of arms, stated that the "gmina (municipality) coat of arms should be placed on the flags, and next to the official names of the gmina (municipilaty)". It remains unknown how such statement was meant to be interpreted. The municipal council had begun the process of designing the flag, however it was cancelled, and the municipality never had established any proper flag. On 27 October 2002, the municipality ceased to exist, and was replaced by the district of Bemowo.

=== Białołęka ===
The flag of the Gmina Warsaw-Białołęka.

The flag of the Gmina Warsaw-Białołęka was divided horizontally into three stripes of the same width. They were, from top to bottom, light green, yellow, and red. The flag colours were inspired by the municipal coat of arms. The green colour symbolizes hope, happiness, and honour, yellow (golden) colour, nobleness, kindness, and intelligence, and the red colour, the bravery, and valor. The flag was adopted on 28 April 1995. On 27 October 2002, the municipality ceased to exist and was replaced by the district of Białołęka, which continues to use the flag to the present day.

=== Bielany ===
The flag of the Gmina Warsaw-Bielany, with the de jure proportions of 53:103.

The flag of the Gmina Warsaw-Bielany, with the de facto proportions of 2:3, noted to be used instead.

The flag of the Gmina Warsaw-Bielany was divided horizontally into three stripes of the same width. They were yellow on top, and red on bottom, which were the same colours, as those of the flag of Warsaw. According to the illustration attached to the establishing law resolution, the aspect ratio of the flag proportion of its height to its width, were 53:103 (1:1.94). Despite that, the flag flown at the municipal hall building had been noted to have its proportions more closer to 2:3. The flag of Warsaw, after which this flag had been based, did not have specified proportions. The flag of Gmina Warsaw-Bielany was adopted on 16 December 1995. On 27 October 2002, the municipality ceased to exist, and was replaced by the district of Bielany.

=== Rembertów ===
The flag of the Gmina Warsaw-Rembertów, with the proportions of 2:3.

The flag of the Gmina Warsaw-Rembertów, with the proportions of 22:41.

The flag of the Gmina Warsaw-Rembertów was divided into four fields, that were of red and yellow colour, placed in the checkboard pattern. They were placed in two horizontal rows, with the fields on the left having the width of 1/3 of the flag width. The top left, and bottom right fields were yellow, while the top right, and bottom left fields, red. The colours were based on the yellow and red flag of Warsaw. In coat of arms and flag of Rembertów, the yellow colour symbolizes the sands of the nearby dessert near Warsaw, and red symbolizes the blood of people who fought in Rembertów during World War II. There were two different flag proportion stated in different documents. According to the illustration attached to the establishing law resolution, the aspect ratio of the flag proportion of its height to its width, was 2:3 (1:1.5), while, according to the municipal by-law, the proportions were 22:41 (1:1.86). The flag was established on 7 February 1996. On 27 October 2002, the municipality ceased to exist, and was replaced by the district of Rembertów.

=== Targówek ===
The flag of the Gmina Warsaw-Targówek.

The flag of the Gmina Warsaw-Targówek was divided into three horizontal stripes of the equal width. They were, from top to bottom, white, yellow, and red. The colours were the same, as those of the coat of arms, and it was stated by the municipality, that said colours were chosen for the flag, as white and red are used in the flag of Poland, and yellow, and red, in the flag of Warsaw. The flag was adopted on 13 November 1997. In 2002, the municipality ceased to exist, and was replaced by the district of Targówek.

=== Ursus ===
The flag of Gmina Warsaw-Ursus.

The flag of Gmina Warsaw-Ursus was divided into four horizontal stripes. Of which, top and bottom stripes, were of the same height, which was the 1/3 of the height of the flag. The two stripes in the middle, had the height of the 1/6 of the height of the flag, each. The colours of the stripes, from top to bottom, were: green, yellow, red, and green. The flag was originally introduced in the resolution from 20 December 1996, which however was not approved, due to the opposition by the voivode of the Warsaw Voivodeship, how argued that legally, gminas (municipalities) were not permitted to have their own flags. Such decision was contested by the municipality, which eventually led to the Supreme Administrative Court of Poland siding with the voivode's decision, in the hearing on 31 January 1997. Despite that, using the legal loopholes, the municipality adopted the design on 29 April 1997, in the municipal by-law, in which, the design was referred to as the "colours of the municipality", instead of a "flag".

In the original 1996 resolution, there was also introduced the design of the flag of municipality mayor, which depicted a brown bear standing on its back feet, holding a yellow halberd, placed in the flag centre, on a green background. The flag was a banner of arms of the municipal coat of arms. However, said flag was not reintroduced by the municipality in its 1997 by-law.

On 27 October 2002, the municipality ceased to exist, and was replaced by the district of Ursus.

=== Ursynów ===
The flag of Gmina Warsaw-Ursynów, with the proportions 100:99 as described in the establishing resolution.

The flag of the Gmina Warsaw-Ursynów, with the proportions of 5:8, de facto used by the municipality.

The flag of Gmina Warsaw-Ursynów was a divided into three horizontal stripes, that were, from the top to bottom, navy blue, yellow, and red. The yellow and red stripes referenced the flag of Warsaw, while meaning behind the blue stripe were unknown. The aspect ratio of flag proportions, of its height to its width, was described in the establishing resolution as 100:99, although in practice, such proportions were not used. Instead, the flag was usually given a shape of a wider rectangle, with the proportions of 5:8. The proportion of the stripes to each other were described as equal 26:7:7, however, those proportion also remain unused in practice. Instead, the flag is usually presented with the blue stripe two times bigger than the remaining two stripes, with the proportion equal 2:1:1. On 27 October 2002, the municipality ceased to exist, and was replaced by the district of Ursynów.

=== Wawer ===
The flag of Gmina Warsaw-Wawer.

The flag of Gmina Warsaw-Wawer, was divided vertically into three stripes. The middle stripe was red, and had the width of 3/5 of the flag's width. On both sides of the flag were yellow stripes, and each having the width of 1/5 of the flag's width. In the flag centre, was placed a frayed yellow letter W, with the height of the half of the flag's height. The aspect ratio of the flag proportion of its height to its width, was 5:8. The letter W commemorates the Wawer massacre, during which, on the night of 26 to 27 December 1939, 107 Polish civilians were executed by Nazi Germany officers, in the occupied Wawer, and the inscriptions "Wawer pomścimy" (from Polish: we will revenge Wawer), that were written on the building walls by inhabitants of Warsaw, following the massacre. The yellow and red are the colours of the flag of Warsaw. The flag was adopted on 28 December 1999. In 2002, the municipality ceased to exist, and was replaced by the district of Wawer.

=== Włochy ===
The Gmina Warsaw-Włochy never had its own flag. However, the municipal by-law established on 16 February 1996, stated that the "gmina (municipality) uses the coat of arms and city colours [...], marked with the name 'Warsaw-Włochy'". It remains unknown how such statement was meant to be interpreted. In 2002, the municipality ceased to exist, and was replaced by the district of Włochy.

== Former 1960s flags ==
Around 1961, the districts of Mokotów, Ochota, Praga-Południe, Praga-Północ, Śródmieście, Wola, and Żoliborz began unofficially using these flags during the Spartakiad sporting events in the city. There is not any known legal document establishing their usage. Despite that, the flags were occasionally used by the districts outside of sporting events before eventually being phased out.

=== Downtown ===
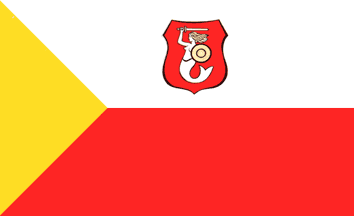
The 1960s unofficial flag of Śródmieście.

The flag of Downtown was formed from a yellow isosceles triangle that extended from the hoist to around 1/3 the flag's length over two horizontal stripes of equal height, white on the top and red on the bottom. In the centre of the white stripe was placed a coat of arms designed to be similar to the coat of arms of Warsaw. It consisted of a red Polish-style escutcheon with a beige mermaid facing left, holding a golden sword above her head in her right hand and a circular golden shield near her chest in her left hand. The white and red were for the flag of Poland, while the yellow and red were for the flag of Warsaw.

=== Mokotów ===
The 1960s unofficial flag of Mokotów.

The flag of Mokotów consisted of four fields. It was divided in half diagonally by two stripes of equal width, yellow and red, going from top right to bottom left corners of the flag. The remaining triangular field on the left was white, while the field on the right, dark blue. The yellow and red used were the colours of the flag of Warsaw.

=== Ochota ===
The 1960s unofficial flag of Ochota.

The flag of Ochota consisted of a green diagonal stripe going from the right left to the right bottom corner of the flag, placed on a white background.

=== Praga-Południe ===
The unofficial 1960s flag of Praga-Południe.

The flag of Praga-Południe consisted of a yellow background with a red stripe 2/3 the width of the flag and half the height placed in the bottom left corner. The yellow and red used were the colours of the flag of Warsaw.

=== Praga-Północ ===
The 1960s unofficial flag of Praga-Północ.

The flag of Praga-Północ consisted of a black diagonal stripe going from the right left to the right bottom corner of the flag, placed on a white background.

=== Wola ===
The unofficial 1960s flag of Wola.

The flag of Wola was divided into horizontal three stripes. The top red stripe had the half of the height of the flag. Two bottom stripes were white and red, and each of them had the height of 1/4 of the flag. White and red were the colours of the flag of Poland.

=== Żoliborz ===
The 1960s unofficial flag of Żoliborz.

The flag of Żoliborz was divided into three horizontal stripes of equal width. They were, from top to bottom: white, green, and white. In the top left corner of the flag was placed a green letter Z with stroke (Ƶ), which had a form of a letter Z, with a vertical bar (line) placed in the middle of its height middle, as parallel to the top and bottom lines forming the letter. In Polish, said letter is used as the alternative spelling of the letter Z with overdot (Ż), which is the first letter in the name of the district.

== Other former flags ==
=== Wesoła ===
The flag of Wesoła.

On 1 January 2002, the towns of Wesoła and Sulejówek, were incorporated into the Warsaw County, which additionally included the city of Warsaw. Wesoła continued to be part of the county until 27 October 2002, when the county was disestablished and replaced by the city of Warsaw, and Wesoła becoming the district of Warsaw.

The flag of Wesoła was divided diagonally into two fields, with the dividing line going from the bottom left to the top right corners. The left field was white, and the right field, red. In the white field, near the right top corner, was placed a yellow circle, its top portion cut on the top edge of the flag. The flag was officially adopted in 1999, though, it was already used unofficially before that.

=== Sulejówek ===
The flag of Sulejówek.

On 1 January 2002, the towns of Sulejówek and Wesoła, were incorporated into the Warsaw County, which also included the city of Warsaw. On 27 October 2002 the county ceased to exist, and Sulejówek was incorporated into nearby Mińsk County.

The flag of Sulejówek is divided into four horizontal stripes. The top and bottom stripes are light blue, and has the height of 2/5 of the flag's height. The two middle stripes are white and yellow, and each of them has the height of 1/10 of the flag. The colours were adopted from the town coat of arms of arms. The light blue was the colour of the dress uniform of Józef Piłsudski, Chief of State of Poland from 1918 to 1922. The flag was adopted in 2000.
