= Public holidays in Poland =

Holidays in Poland are regulated by the Non-working Days Act of 18 January 1951 (Ustawa z dnia 18 stycznia 1951 o dniach wolnych od pracy; Journal of Laws 1951 No. 4, Item 28). The Act, as amended in 2010, currently defines fourteen public holidays.

== Public holidays ==
Note: The table below lists only public holidays, i.e. holidays which are legally considered to be non-working days.

Date	English name	Official Local Name (Informal Local Name)	Remarks
1 January	New Year's Day	Nowy Rok	
6 January	Epiphany	Objawienie Pańskie (Trzech Króli)	In effect since 2011.
Movable Sunday in Spring	Easter Sunday	pierwszy dzień Wielkiej Nocy (Niedziela Wielkanocna)	
Monday following Easter Sunday	Easter Monday	drugi dzień Wielkiej Nocy (Poniedziałek Wielkanocny or Lany Poniedziałek)	
1 May	May Day	Święto Państwowe (Święto Pracy)	This holiday is officially called the State Holiday (Święto Państwowe). However, it is unofficially called Labour Day (Święto Pracy), and coincides with International Workers' Day. It is also EU Accession Day marking the 2004 accession of Poland as a member of the European Union.
3 May	Constitution Day	Święto Narodowe Trzeciego Maja (Święto Konstytucji 3 Maja)	Celebrated on the anniversary of the adoption of the first constitution in Europe - the Constitution of 3 May 1791. Coincides with the Day of Blessed Virgin Mary, Queen of Poland.
Seventh Sunday after Easter	Pentecost Sunday	Zesłanie Ducha Świętego (Zielone Świątki)	As this holiday always falls on a Sunday, it is not widely known that it is considered a non-working day, as all Sundays are already non-working days and holidays falling on Sunday do not give the right to another free day.
Ninth Thursday after Easter	Corpus Christi	Uroczystość Najświętszego Ciała i Krwi Chrystusa (Boże Ciało)	Catholic holiday.
15 August	Assumption Day	Wniebowzięcie Najświętszej Maryi Panny (Święto Wojska Polskiego)	This is also Armed Forces Day (Święto Wojska Polskiego), celebrating Polish victory in the Battle of Warsaw (1920).
1 November	All Saints' Day	Uroczystość Wszystkich Świętych (Wszystkich Świętych)	This day is traditionally celebrated by visiting the graves of deceased family members because All Souls' Day (Zaduszki or Święto Zmarłych), which falls the day after, is not a public holiday.
11 November	Independence Day	Narodowe Święto Niepodległości (Dzień Niepodległości)	Celebrated on the anniversary of regaining independence on 11 November 1918.
24 December	Christmas Eve	Wigilia Bożego Narodzenia	In effect from 2025.
25 December	Christmas Day	pierwszy dzień Bożego Narodzenia	
26 December	Second Day of Christmas	drugi dzień Bożego Narodzenia	This holiday coincides with Saint Stephen's Day.

=== May holidays ===
Under communist rule, 1 May was celebrated as Labour Day with government-endorsed parades, concerts and similar events. The holiday carried over to present day Poland as State Holiday, albeit without any formal connection to International Workers' Day. In addition, 3 May was reinstated as 3 May Constitution Day. The May holidays (1, 2 and 3 May) are called "majówka" in Polish (roughly translated as May-day picnic).

== National and state holidays ==
The following are national and state holidays in Poland, although they are normally working days unless declared a public holiday.

- 19 February - Polish Science Day (Dzień Nauki Polskiej), established in 2020
- 1 March - National Cursed Soldiers Remembrance Day (Narodowy Dzień Pamięci „Żołnierzy Wyklętych”), established in 2011
- 24 March - National Day for the Remembrance of Poles Rescuing Jews under German Occupation (Narodowy Dzień Pamięci Polaków ratujących Żydów pod okupacją niemiecką), established in 2018
- 14 April - Baptism of Poland Day (Święto Chrztu Polski), established in 2019
- 1 May - State Holiday (Święto Państwowe), public holiday, established in 1950
- 3 May - 3 May Constitution Day (Święto Narodowe Trzeciego Maja), public holiday; first observed in 1919, disestablished in 1946, then reinstated in 1990
- 8 May - National Victory Day (Narodowy Dzień Zwycięstwa), established in 2015 to replace the old National Victory and Freedom Day
- 12 July- Day of Struggle and Martyrdom of the Polish Villages (Dzień Walki i Męczeństwa Wsi Polskiej), established in 2017
- 1 August - National Warsaw Uprising Remembrance Day (Narodowy Dzień Pamięci Powstania Warszawskiego), established in 2009
- 31 August - Day of Solidarity and Freedom (Dzień Solidarności i Wolności) set on the anniversary of August Agreement from 1980, established in 2005
- 19 October - National Day of Remembrance for Steadfast Clergy (Narodowy Dzień Pamięci Duchownych Niezłomnych), established in 2018
- 11 November - National Independence Day (Narodowe Święto Niepodległości), public holiday; first observed in 1937, disestablished in 1945, then reinstated in 1989
- 27 December - Greater Poland Uprising Remebrence Day (Narodowy Dzień Pamięci Zwycięskiego Powstania Wielkopolskiego) established in 2021

== Former national and state holidays ==
In the past, there were public holidays newly established by the communist authorities after the Second World War. These were intended to replace discontinued original national holidays such as the National Independence Day and the 3 May Constitution Day and to serve propaganda purposes. All were canceled after the fall of communism in Poland.

- 9 May - National Victory and Freedom Day (Narodowe Święto Zwycięstwa i Wolności), established in 1945, disestablished in 1951 although still celebrated annually by communist authorities (celebrated for the last time in 1989)
- 22 July - National Day of the Rebirth of Poland (Narodowe Święto Odrodzenia Polski), set on the anniversary of the PKWN Manifesto's signing, established in 1945, abolished in 1990 (celebrated for the last time in 1989)
- 7 November - Great October Socialist Revolution Day (Wielka Październikowa Rewolucja Socjalistyczna), although it was not an official non-working state holiday it was celebrated by communist authorities (celebrated for the last time in 1989)

== Other holidays ==
=== Holidays declared by statute ===
The following are holidays declared by statute in Poland. These holidays are declared in statute and as such they form a part of law in Poland. However, these holidays are not granted the distinction of national or state holidays. These are normally working days, unless coinciding with a public holiday.

- 27 January – Public Employment Services Worker's Day, Dzień Pracownika Publicznych Służb Zatrudnienia, established in 2010
- 8 February – Prison Service Day, Święto Służby Więziennej, established in 2010
- 22 February – Crime Victims Day, Dzień Ofiar Przestępstw, coinciding with European Victims Day, established in 2003
- 2 May – Flag Day, Dzień Flagi Rzeczypospolitej Polskiej, established in 2004
- 2 May – Polish Diaspora Day, Dzień Polonii i Polaków za Granicą, established in 2002
- 4 May – Firefighters Day, Dzień Strażaka, coinciding with International Firefighters' Day, established in 2002
- 16 May – Border Guard's Day, Święto Straży Granicznej, established in 1991 (this may coincide with Pentecost)
- 29 May – Veterans of Overseas Military Activities Day, Dzień Weterana Działań poza Granicami Państwa, coinciding with International Day of United Nations Peacekeepers, established in 2011 (this may coincide with Pentecost or Corpus Christi)
- 12 June – State Protection Service's Day, Święto SOP, established in 2018 (this may coincide with Pentecost or Corpus Christi)
- 13 June – Military Gendarmerie Day, Święto Żandarmerii Wojskowej, established in 2001 (this may coincide with Pentecost or Corpus Christi)
- 24 July – Police Day, Święto Policji, established in 1995
- 31 July – Treasury Day, Dzień Skarbowości, celebrated since 2008, established in 2010
- 15 August – Armed Forces Day, Święto Wojska Polskiego, this holiday coincides with a public holiday (Assumption of Mary), established in 1992
- 29 August – Municipal Police Day, Dzień Straży Gminnej, established in 1997
- 1 September – Veterans Day, Dzień Weterana, established in 1997
- 21 September – Customs Service Day, Dzień Służby Celnej, established in 1999
- 13 October – Paramedics' Day, Dzień Ratownictwa Medycznego, established in 2006
- 14 October – Teachers' Day, Dzień Edukacji Narodowej, established in 1972
- 16 October – Saint Pope John Paul II Day, Dzień Papieża Jana Pawła II, established in 2005
- 21 November – Social Workers' Day, Dzień Pracownika Socjalnego, established in 1990

=== Holidays declared by parliamentary resolution ===
The following are holidays declared by parliamentary resolution in Poland. These holidays are declared by a resolution of Sejm. These holidays do not form a part of law in Poland, and consequently are not granted the distinction of national or state holidays. These are normally working days.

- 3 March – Polish-Romanian Solidarity Day, Dzień Solidarności Polsko-Rumuńskiej, established in 2023
- 23 March – Polish-Hungarian Friendship Day, Dzień Przyjaźni Polsko-Węgierskiej, established in 2007 (this may coincide with Easter or Easter Monday)
- 24 March – National Life Day, Narodowy Dzień Życia, established in 2004 (this may coincide with Easter or Easter Monday)
- 13 April – Katyn Memorial Day, Dzień Pamięci Ofiar Zbrodni Katyńskiej, set on the anniversary of the discovery of mass graves in Katyn, established in 2007 (this may coincide with Easter or Easter Monday)
- 18 April – Coma Patients' Day, Dzień Pacjenta w Śpiączce, established in 2012 (this may coincide with Easter or Easter Monday)
- 28 April – Day for Safety and Health at Work, Dzień Bezpieczeństwa i Ochrony Zdrowia w Pracy, coincides with Workers' Memorial Day, established in 2003
- 27 May – Local Government's Day, Dzień Samorządu Terytorialnego, set on the anniversary of the first local government elections in Poland, established in 2000 (this may coincide with Pentecost or Corpus Christi)
- 30 May – Foster Care Day, Dzień Rodzicielstwa Zastępczego, established in 2006 (this may coincide with Pentecost or Corpus Christi)
- 1 June – Day Without Alcohol, Dzień bez Alkoholu, established in 2006 (this may coincide with Pentecost or Corpus Christi)
- 4 June – Day of Freedom and Citizens' Rights, Dzień Wolności i Praw Obywatelskich, set on the anniversary of 4th of June 1989 Polish elections, established in 2013 (this may coincide with Pentecost or Corpus Christi)
- 14 June – National Day of Remembrance of Nazi Concentration Camps Victims, Narodowy Dzień Pamięci Ofiar Nazistowskich Obozów Koncentracyjnych, set on the anniversary of the arrival of the first mass transport of political prisoners to Auschwitz concentration camp, established in 2006 (this may coincide with Corpus Christi)
- 28 June – National Day of Remembrance of Poznań 1956 protests, Narodowy Dzień Pamięci Poznańskiego Czerwca 1956, set on the anniversary of the outbreak of Poznań 1956 protests, established in 2006
- 11 July - National Day of Remembrance of the victims of the Genocide of the Citizens of the Polish Republic committed by Ukrainian Nationalists, Narodowy Dzień Pamięci Ofiar Ludobójstwa dokonanego przez ukraińskich nacjonalistów na obywatelach II Rzeczypospolitej Polskiej, set on the anniversary of the "bloody sunday" in Volhynia, the culmination of the massacres of Poles in Volhynia, established in 2016
- 2 August – Genocide Remembrance Day of the Roma and Sinti, Dzień Pamięci o Zagładzie Romów i Sinti, set on the anniversary of the Roma and Sinti extermination at Auschwitz concentration camp, established in 2011
- 17 September – Sybirak's Day, Dzień Sybiraka, set on the anniversary of Soviet invasion of Poland, established in 1998
- 27 September – Polish Underground State's Day, Dzień Podziemnego Państwa Polskiego, set on the anniversary of the formation of Service for Poland's Victory, established in 2013
- 4 October – Animals' Day, Dzień Zwierząt, coincides with World Animal Day, established in 2006
- 13 December – Martial Law Victims Remembrance Day, Dzień Pamięci Ofiar Stanu Wojennego, set on the anniversary of declaration of Martial law in Poland, established in 2002

== Other observances ==
- Grandmother's Day on 21 January
- Grandfather's Day on 22 January,
- Traders' Day on 2 February
- Valentine's Day on 14 February
- Cat's Day on 17 February
- Tłusty Czwartek on the last Thursday before Lent
- Ostatki on the last day of Carnival,
- Ash Wednesday on the first day of Lent,
- Women's Day on 8 March
- Day of Polish Statistics on 9 March,
- Men's Day on 10 March
- World Consumer Rights Day on 15 March
- Earth Day on March equinox day
- Truant's Day on 21 March
- ABW Day on 6 April, Polish counter-intelligence agency's (ABW) holiday, celebrated since 2004
- Maundy Thursday on the Thursday immediately preceding Easter Sunday
- Good Friday on the Friday immediately preceding Easter Sunday
- Holy Saturday on the Saturday immediately preceding Easter Sunday - Święconka is performed on this day
- Śmigus Dyngus on Easter Monday (the day following Easter Sunday) is when traditionally the young (and young of heart) have water fights, in continuation of a pagan spring fertility ritual observed in many other cultures
- Warsaw Ghetto Uprising remembered on 19 April
- International Mother Earth Day on 22 April
- Majówka is a spring festival celebrated throughout Europe
- Europe Day on 9 May
- Mother's Day on 26 May,
- World No Tobacco Day on 31 May,
- Children's Day on 1 June
- Father's Day on 23 June
- Kupala Night (Noc Kupały) on the night from 21 to 22 June
- Saint John's Eve "Noc Świętojańska" on the night from 23 to 24 June
- Dog's Day on 1 July
- Power Engineer's Day on 14 August
- Dożynki in late August or early September
- Anniversary of the outbreak of the Second World War in Poland on 1 September
- Anniversary of the Soviet invasion of Poland on 17 September
- Car-Free Day on 22 September
- Boy's Day (Dzień Chłopaka) on 30 September - on this day girls give presents to boys
- Polish Post Day (Postman's Day) on 18 October
- Mongrel's Day on 25 October
- Halloween on 31 October
- Civil Service Day on November 11, customary Polish holiday, celebrated since 2000, in conjunction with National Independence Day celebrations
- Andrzejki on the night from 29 to 30 November - on this day people (mainly children and teens) are making prophecy by pouring candle wax by key hole to water and guessing what the wax shape means
- Miners' Day on 4 December - Barbórka
- Mikołajki on 6 December - on this day Santa Claus gives sweets to children
- Sylwester on 31 December

== See also ==
- Polish flag flying days
