= Polish Diaspora Day =

Public holiday celebrated in Poland

- Observed by: Poland
- Significance: Commemoration of the Polish diaspora
- Date: 2 May
- Next time: 2 May 2026
- Frequency: annual
- Related to: Polish National Flag Day

The Polish Diaspora Day (Note: Polish: Dzień Polonii i Polaków za Granicą, literally: Day of Polish diaspora and Poles residing abroad) is a public holiday celebrated in Poland on 2 May, to commemorate the Polish diaspora around the world. It was established on 20 March 2002, by the Sejm of Poland (lower house of the parliament), from the initiative of the Senate of Poland (upper house of the parliament). It is celebrated on the same day as the Polish National Flag Day. It takes place a day after the International Workers' Day (1 May), and a day before the 3 May Constitution Day (3 May).
