= Polish National Flag Day =

National holiday

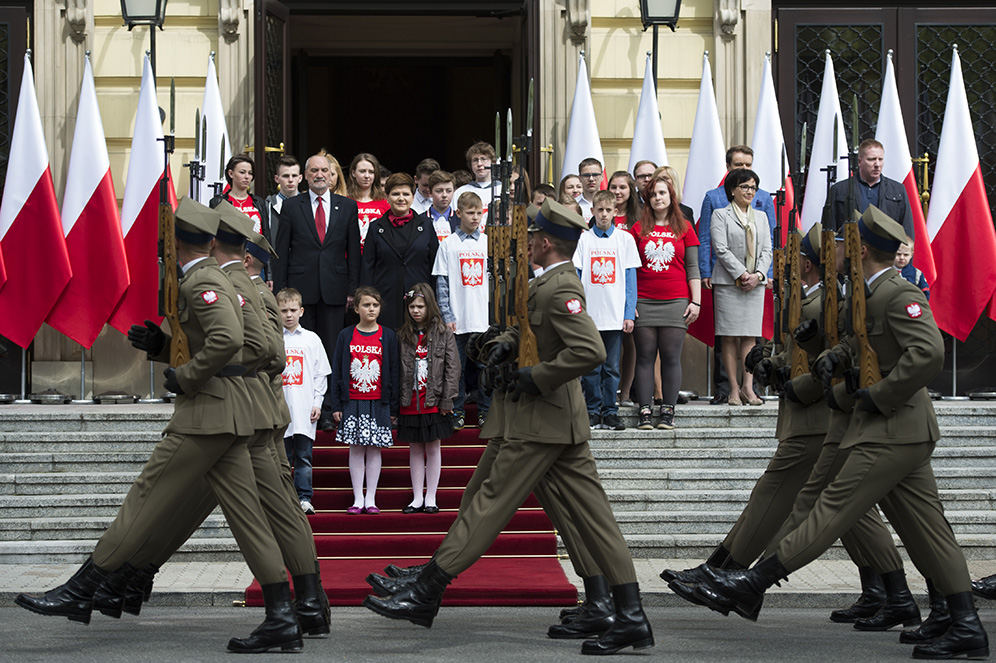
- Flag Day in Warsaw, 2016, with prime minister Beata Szydło
- Official name: Polish National Flag Day
- Also called: Dzień Flagi Narodowej Polski
- Date: 2 May
- Next time: 2 May 2027
- Frequency: annual
- Related to: Polish Diaspora Day

The Polish National Flag Day, also known as the Day of the Flag of the Republic of Poland (Polish: Dzień Flagi Rzeczypospolitej Polskiej), is a national holiday in Poland which takes place on 2 May every year. The holiday is celebrated on the day between two national holidays: 1 May (called International Workers' Day) and 3 May (Constitution Day).

The Polish Diaspora Day is likewise celebrated on this date.

While not a public holiday in Poland, many people take this day off as it is between two national holidays.

== Establishment of the holiday ==
The holiday was first introduced to the Polish Parliament through a members' bill proposed by Edward Płonek on 15 October 2003. According to the justification of the law introducing the holiday, the reasons why 2 May was chosen were that it marked a day when Poles could reflect on Polish history as it was preceded and followed by national holidays, and because it coincided with Polish Diaspora Day. Historical reasons also played a key role in the choice of the date: on 2 May 1945, the First Polish Army conquering Nazi-controlled Berlin put a white and red flag on the Berlin Victory Column and on the Reichstag. The authorities of the Polish People's Republic stopped the celebrations of Constitution Day on 3 May and requested that all national flags be removed prior to it. The establishment of the Third Polish Republic marked a rejection of a lot of the policies of the regime that preceded it, including a clear return to celebrations such as Constitution Day.

In the course of legislative work, the Senate of the Republic of Poland, in its resolution of 12 February, 2004, proposed amendments such as: replacing Polish National Flag Day with the Day of the White Eagle, recognizing the emblem as the chief among the symbols of the Republic of Poland. Eventually, the Sejm rejected the amendment, and on 20 February 2004, established the National Flag Day of the Republic of Poland.

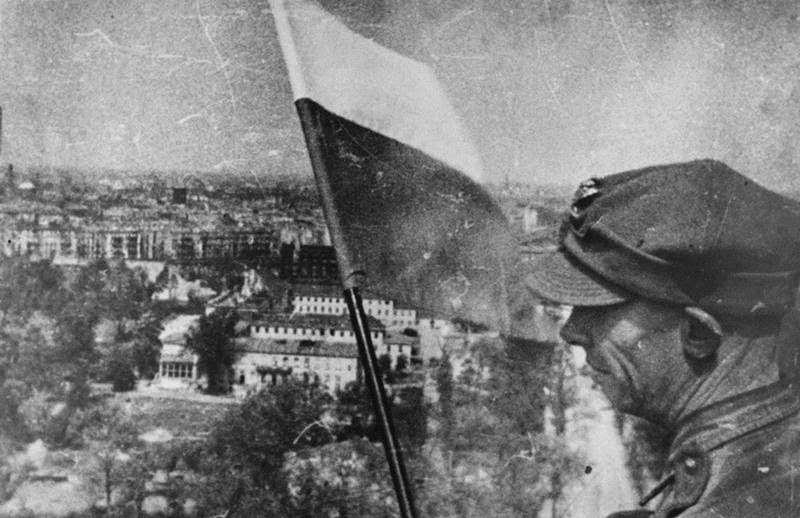
Polish flag hung in the destroyed Berlin, Germany on 2 May 1945.

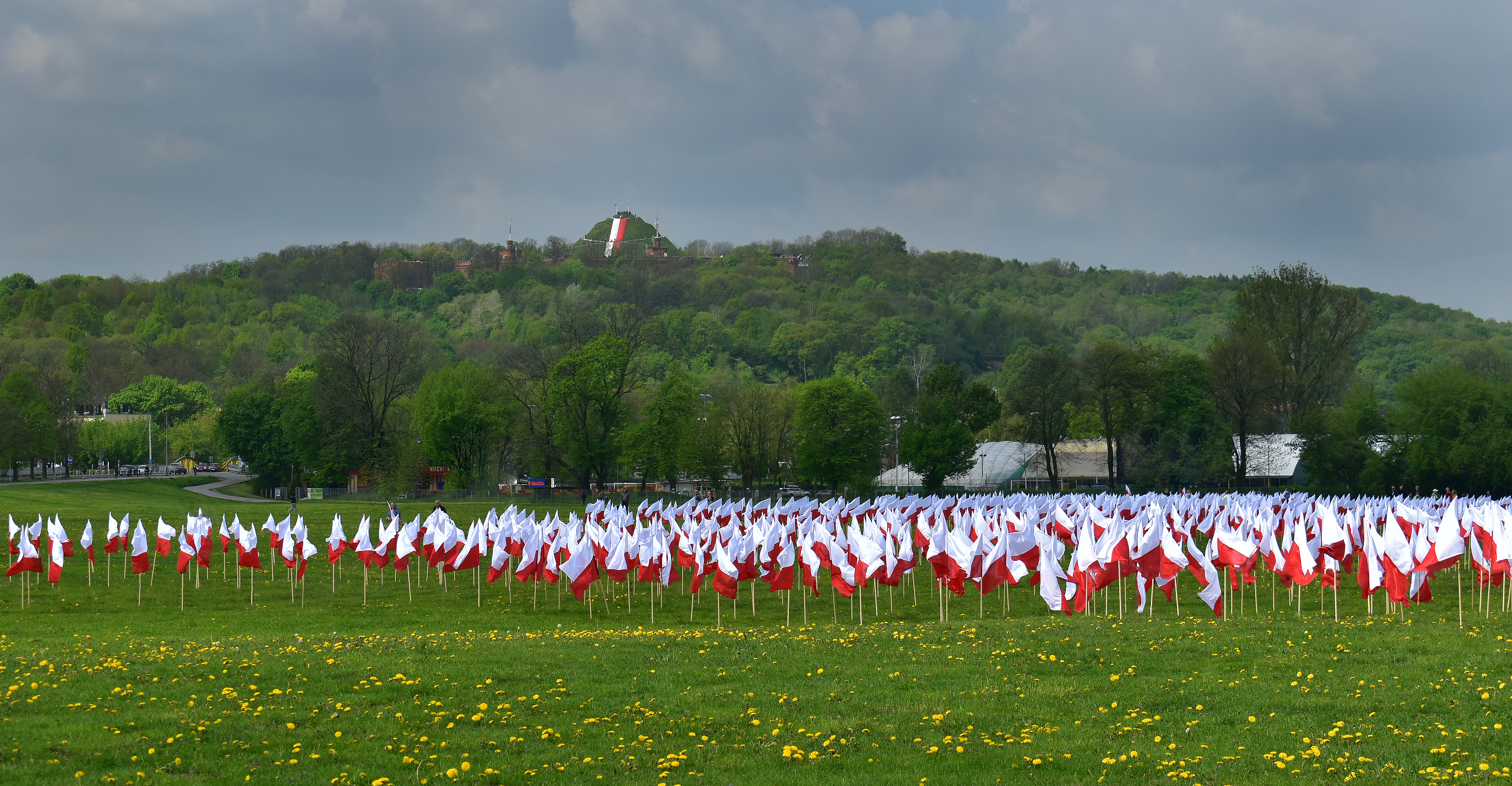
Polish National Flag Day (2019), Błonia Park and Kościuszko Mound, Krakow, Poland.

=== The celebration ===
Various types of patriotic actions and demonstrations are organized on this day. A custom popularized by President Lech Kaczyński and continued by his successors is wearing a national cockade on that day.
