= Edmund Ambroziak =

Polish academic teacher and politician

Alderman of Warsaw County
- In office 1 January 1999 – 27 October 2002
- Preceded by: office established
- Succeeded by: office abolished

Personal details
- Born: January 9, 1945 Białobrzegi, Poland
- Died: May 20, 2016 (aged 71) Warsaw, Poland
- Resting place: Powązki Military Cemetery, Warsaw, Poland
- Party: Solidarity Electoral Action

Edmund Antoni Ambroziak (Polish: [ˈɛd.munt anˈtɔ.ɲi amˈbrɔ.ʑak]; 9 January 1945 – 20 May 2016) was an academic teacher and a politician. From 1999 to 2002, he served as the alderman of Warsaw County in the Masovian Voivodeship, Poland.

== History ==
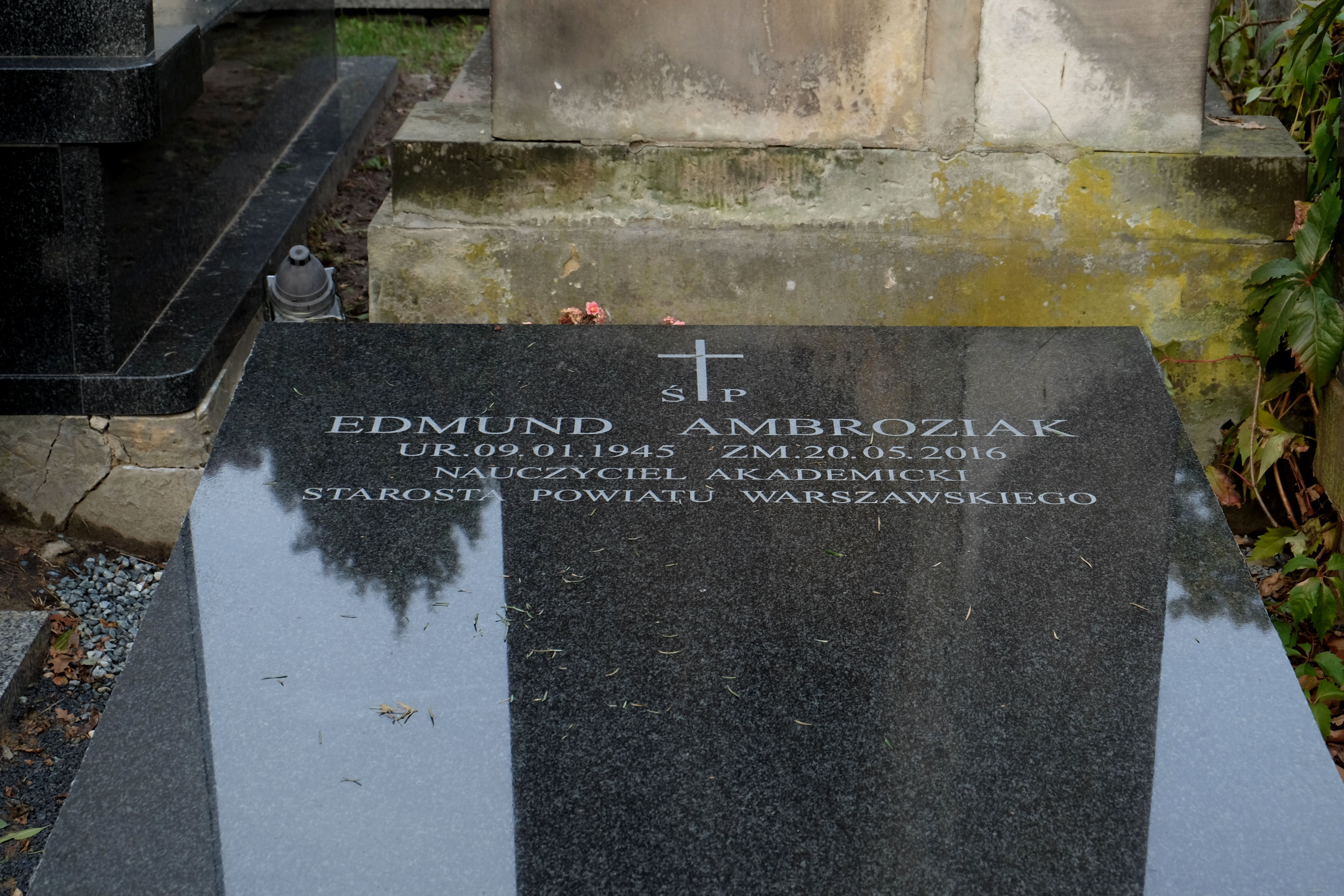
The grave of Edmund Ambroziak at the Powązki Military Cemetery, Warsaw, in 2016.

Ambroziak was born on 9 January 1945 in Białobrzegi, Poland. He became academic teacher, and was a councillor in the gmina (municipality) of Warsaw–Centre, and in the Warsaw County. During the 1997 Polish parliamentary election, he unsuccessfully attempted to gain the mandate to be the candidate of the Solidarity Electoral Action, in the 2nd electoral district, located around the city of Warsaw. From 1999 to 2002, he served as the alderman of the Warsaw County. The county ceased to exist on 27 October 2002, and as such, also his office. Following that, he had retired from politics. Ambroziak had a wife and a daughter. He died on 20 May 2016 in Warsaw, and was buried at the Powązki Military Cemetery (grave no. 32A-8-8) in Warsaw.
