= Flag of Warsaw =

Polish municipal flag

- Flaga Warszawy
- Use: Civil flag
- Proportion: 2:3 (unofficial; popularly used)
- Adopted: 1938
- Design: Horizontal bicolour of yellow (top) and red (bottom)
- Proportion: 5:8 (unofficial; popularly used)

The flag of the city of Warsaw, the capital of Poland, is a bicolour rectangle, divided into two equally-sized horizontal stripes: yellow at the top, and red at the bottom. It began being used in 1938 without official status, and was officially adopted by the city, in 1991.

== Design ==
The flag of the city of Warsaw, the capital of Poland, is a bicolour rectangle, divided into two horizontal stripes of equal width, yellow at the top, and red at the bottom. The flag doesn't have specified proportions, though popularly used proportions include 2:3 and 5:8.

Its colours had been adopted from the coat of arms of the city, which depicts a mermaid with golden (yellow) sword, shield and hair, on the red background, and with a golden (yellow) crown above the escutcheon.

Colour	PANTONE; Coated/ Uncoated	CMYK	RAL	REPSOL GLASS	Folia ASLAN	Folia ORACAL	3M (seria 100)	RGB
	116 C	0:17:90:0	1003	3610	11913	020	100-25	255:214:0
	485 C	0:95:100:0	3020	1670	11921	032	100-368	255:17:0

== History ==
The yellow and red flag begun being used as the symbol of Warsaw in 1938, though without any official status. The flag was officially adopted as the city symbol in 1991.

== See also ==
- Coat of arms of Warsaw
- List of flags of the districts of Warsaw
