= Pope John Paul II Day =

Polish festival celebrated on October 16

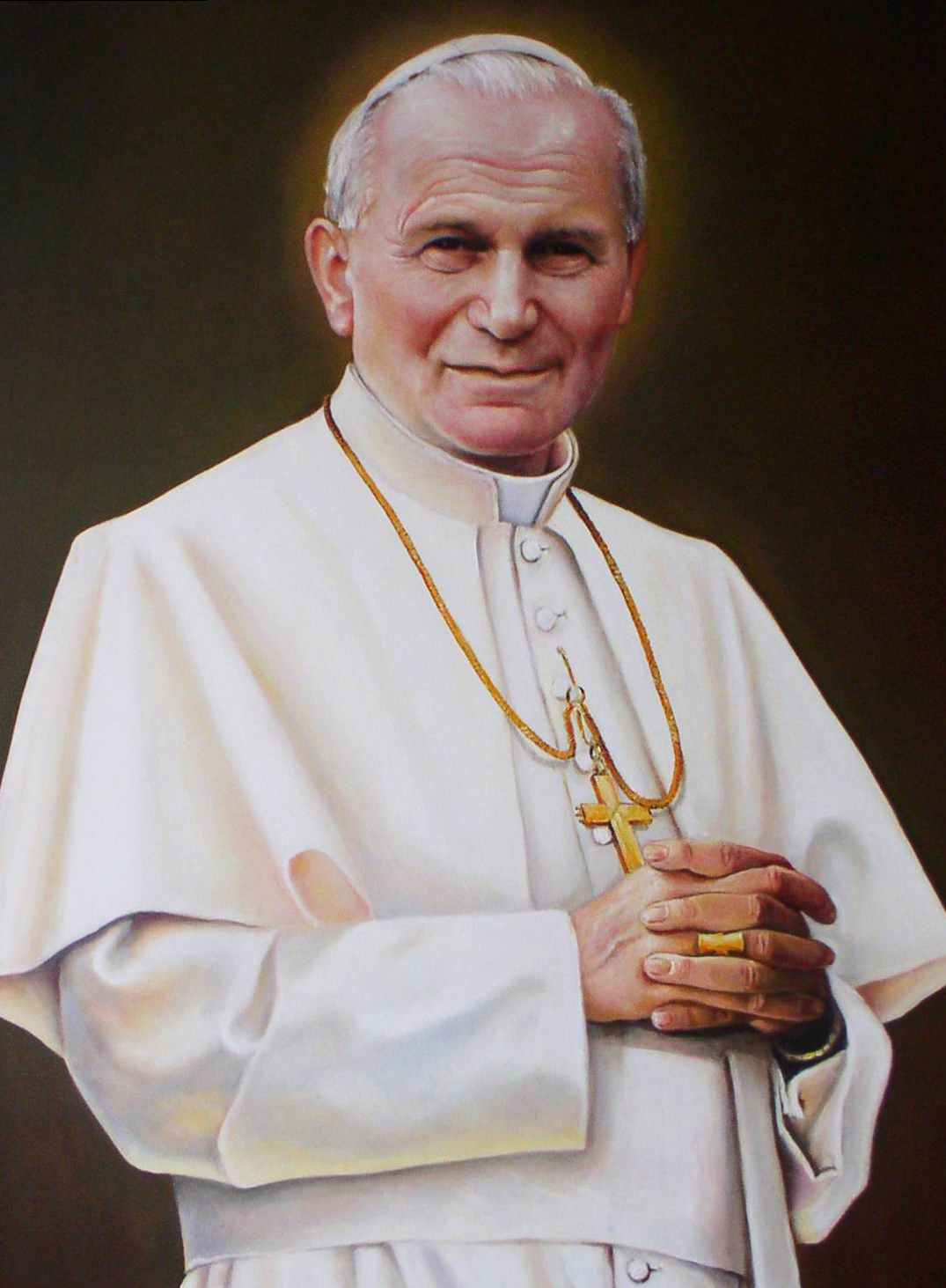
- Official name: Dzień Papieża Jana Pawła II
- Observed by: Polish
- Significance: Commemorates the election of Cardinal Karol Wojtyła to become Pope
- Date: October 16
- Next time: October 16, 2026
- Frequency: annual
- Related to: Papal Day

Pope John Paul II Day (Polish: Dzień Papieża Jana Pawła II) is a Polish festival celebrated every year on October 16. It was established by the Polish Parliament as a tribute to Pope John Paul II. In parallel, it is celebrated by the Catholic Church in Poland as Papal Day, which falls on the Sunday preceding October 16.

== Meaning of the date ==
On October 16, 1978, the Archbishop of Kraków Cardinal Karol Wojtyła was elected as Pope and took the name John Paul II. He was the first Pope in 455 years who was not Italian. His election was widely celebrated in Poland and is seen as one of the factors in the fall of communism there. He is recognised as one of the greatest and most well-known Poles of the modern day.

On the same day in 2002, Pope John Paul II introduced the Luminous Mysteries of the Rosary.

== Establishment ==
October 16 was established as an official celebration by the Polish Parliament on 27 July 2005 - as stated in the resolution - "a tribute to the greatest authority of the twentieth century, a man who reached into the sources of Christianity, taught us solidarity, courage and humility" ("w hołdzie największemu autorytetowi XX wieku, człowiekowi, który sięgając do źródeł chrześcijaństwa, uczył nas solidarności, odwagi i pokory").

The law establishing the holiday was supported by 338 deputies, three were against and two abstained.

== History ==
The day was celebrated for the first time in 2001 but is not a day off from work.

In December 2014, a bill introduced by Conservative MP Władysław Lizoń to recognize April 2 as a day to honour the memory of the late Pope John Paul II received Royal Assent. On April 2 2015, the first Pope John Paul II Day was observed in Canada. It was incidentally also the 10th anniversary of the pope's death. The day is not recognised as a legal holiday or a non-juridical day, nor is it a day off work.

== Papal Day in the Polish Catholic Church ==
Since 2001, the Polish Catholic Church has celebrated Papal Day, a day of gratitude, communion with Pope John Paul II and the promotion of his teaching. It falls on the Sunday before October 16. The coordinator of the day is the Foundation Work of the New Millennium. On Papal Day, money is raised for scholarships for talented Polish youth from low-income and poor families.

=== Themes for Papal Day ===
Day	Theme
2001	The Pontificate Gorges (October 14)
2002	John Paul II - Witness to Hope (October 13)
2003	John Paul II - Apostle Unity (October 12)
2004	John Paul II - The Pilgrim Room (October 10)
2005	John Paul II - The Truth Advocate (October 16)
2006	John Paul II - Servant of Charity (October 15)
2007	John Paul II - The defender of human dignity (October 14)
2008	John Paul II - The young teacher (October 12)
2009	John Paul II - The Pope freedom (October 11)
2010	John Paul II - The courage of holiness (October 10)
2011	John Paul II - Man of Prayer (October 9)
2012	John Paul II - The Pope family (October 14)
2013	John Paul II - The Pope of dialogue (October 13)
2014	John Paul II - Holy B (October 12)
2015	John Paul II - Patron of Families (October 11)
2016	Be witnesses of mercy (October 9)
2017	Let's go forward with hope (October 8)
2018	Radiation of Paternity (October 14)

== See also ==
- World Youth Day
- Public holidays in Poland

== Bibliography ==
- Ustawa z dnia 27 lipca 2005 r. o ustanowieniu 16 października Dniem Papieża Jana Pawła II
- Dzień Papieski – information in Polish about past Papal Days
