= 3 May Constitution Day =

Polish national holiday

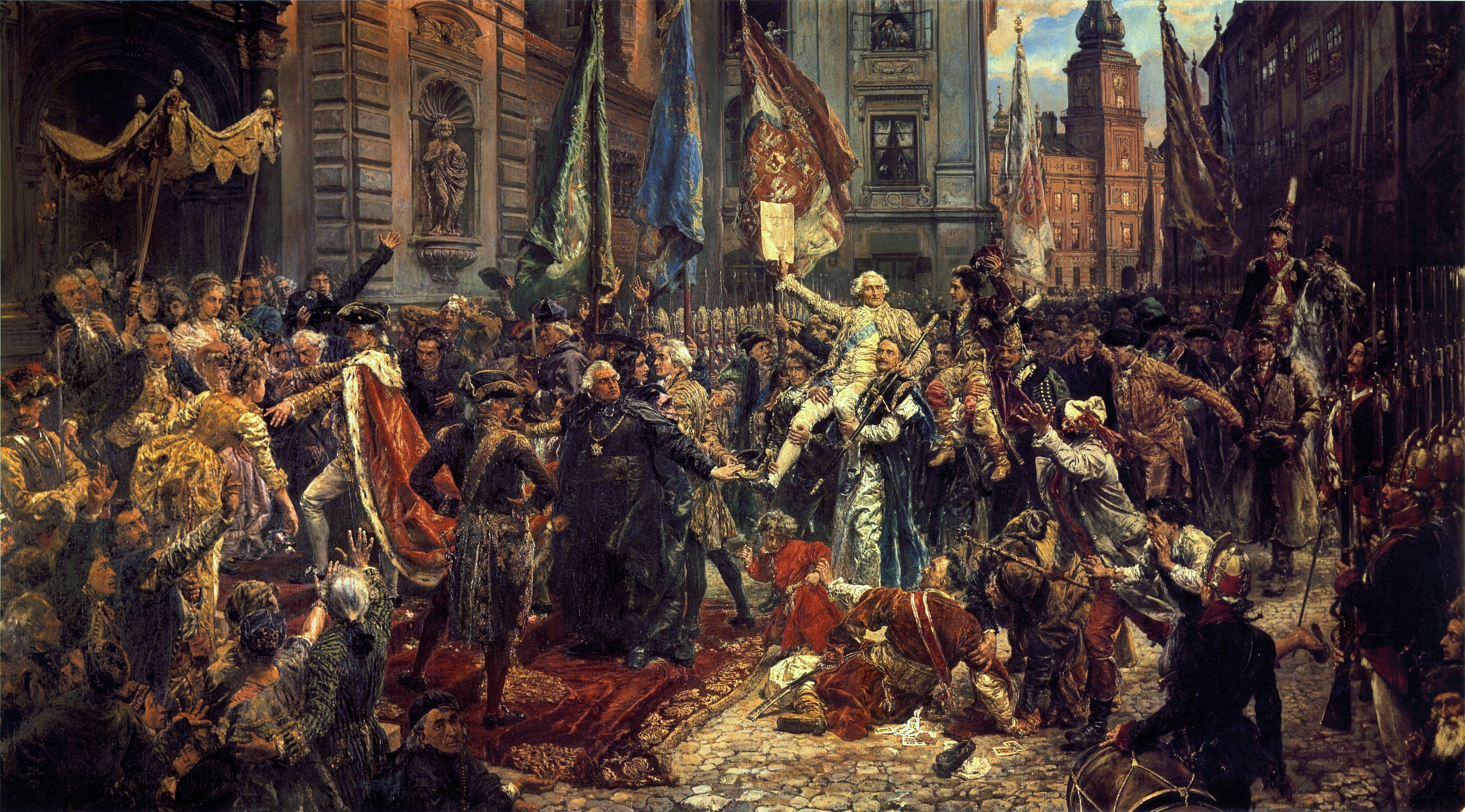
- 3 May Constitution, by Matejko. King Stanisław II Augustus (left) enters St. John's Cathedral, where deputies will swear to uphold the Constitution.
- Official name: Święto Konstytucji 3 Maja
- Observed by: Poland
- Type: national, secular, patriotic
- Significance: Enactment of the 3 May Constitution in 1791
- Celebrations: Parades
- Date: 3 May
- Frequency: annual

3 May Constitution Day (also Third May National Holiday; Polish: Święto Konstytucji 3 Maja) is a Polish national and public holiday. It celebrates the declaration of the Constitution of 3 May 1791—the first modern constitution in Europe. Festivities date back to the Duchy of Warsaw early in the 19th century, but it became an official holiday only in 1919 in the Second Polish Republic. Delisted during the Polish People's Republic, it was reestablished after the fall of communism in modern Poland.

== Background ==
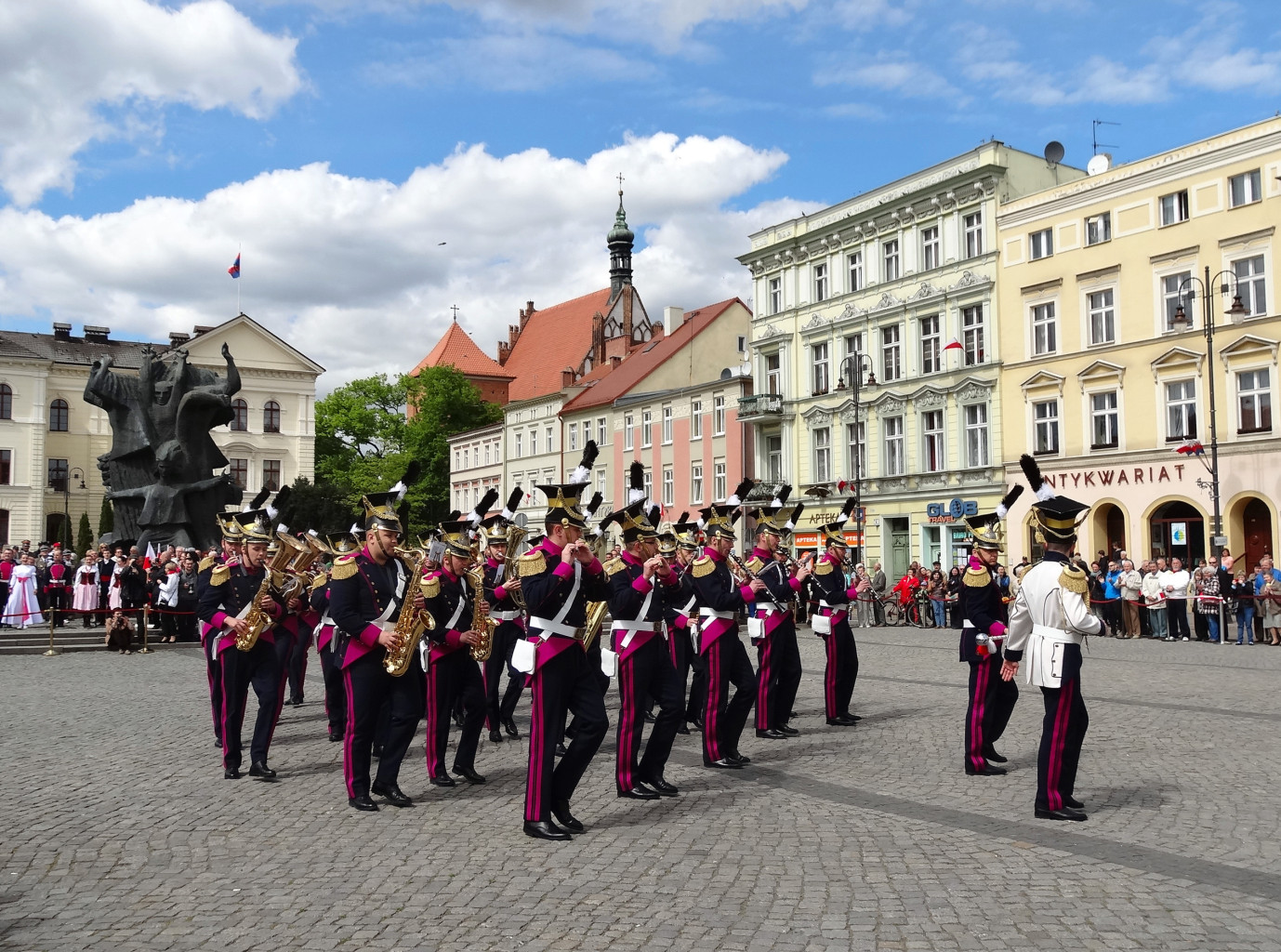
3 May parade in Bydgoszcz, Poland, 2014

The Constitution of 3 May 1791 is considered one of the most important achievements in the history of Poland, despite being in effect for only a year, until the Russo-Polish War of 1792. Historian Norman Davies calls it "the first constitution of its type in Europe"; other scholars also refer to it as the world's second oldest constitution.^{[a]}

The 3 May Constitution was designed to redress long-standing political defects of the Polish–Lithuanian Commonwealth. The Constitution sought to supplant the existing anarchy fostered by some of the country's magnates with a more democratic constitutional monarchy. The adoption of the 3 May Constitution provoked the active hostility of the Commonwealth's neighbours, leading to the Second Partition of Poland in 1792, the Kościuszko Uprising of 1794 and the final, Third Partition of Poland, in 1795. In the words of two of its co-authors, Ignacy Potocki and Hugo Kołłątaj, it was "the last will and testament of the expiring Fatherland."

The memory of the 3 May Constitution—recognized by political scientists as a progressive document for its time—helped keep Polish aspirations for an independent and just society alive for generations, and continued to inform the efforts of its authors' descendants. In Poland it is viewed as a national symbol, and the culmination of all that was good and enlightened in Polish history and culture.

The 3 May anniversary of its adoption has been observed as Poland's most important civil holiday since Poland regained independence in 1918, along with the National Independence Day and the Armed Forces Day. Its importance for the Polish people has been compared to that of 4 July to the Americans.

== Celebrations ==
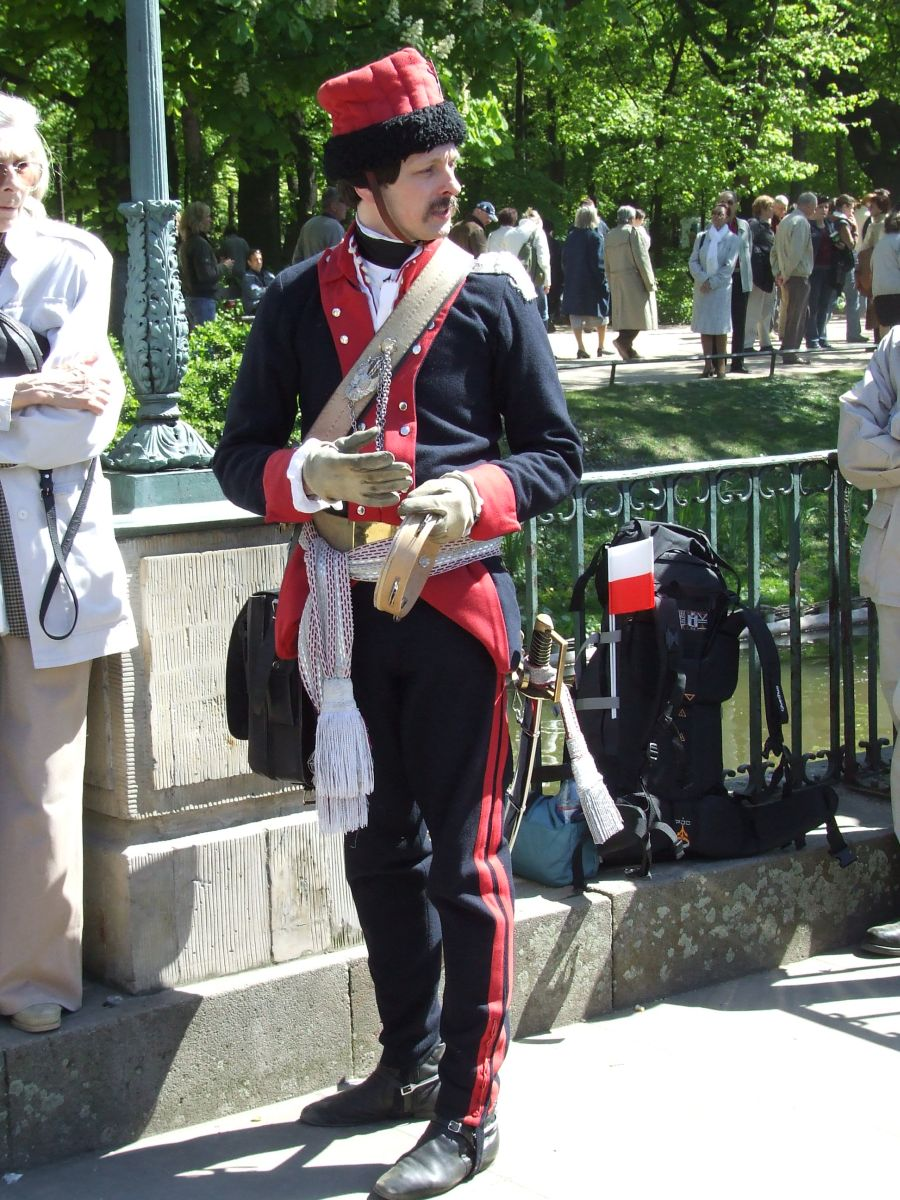
Polish cavalryman in traditional dress uniform during the celebrations of 3 May 2007

3 May was first declared a holiday on 5 May 1791, and celebrated a year later, on 3 May 1792. Banned during the partitions of Poland, it was celebrated in the Duchy of Warsaw in 1807, and unofficially in Congress Poland by various pro-independence activists, more openly during insurrections such as the November Uprising. It was again made an official Polish holiday in April 1919, becoming the first holiday officially introduced in the Second Polish Republic. The 3 May holiday was banned once more during World War II by the Nazi and Soviet occupiers. It was celebrated in Polish cities in May 1945, though mostly spontaneously. The celebrations were officially canceled shortly before 3 May 1946, and anti-communist demonstrations took place later that day. This, along with competition with the communist-endorsed 1 May Labor Day celebrations, meant that the authorities of the Polish People's Republic disapproved of Constitution Day and forbade its celebration. In 1947 it was officially rebranded Democratic Party Day, and in 1951 it was removed from the list of national holidays. Until 1989, 3 May was a common day for anti-government and anti-communist protests. 3 May was restored as an official Polish holiday in April 1990, after the fall of communism. In 2007, 3 May was also declared a Lithuanian national holiday; the first joint celebration by the Polish Sejm and the Lithuanian Seimas took place on 3 May 2007.

In modern Poland, the day is a non-working holiday marked by parades, exhibitions, concerts and speeches by public figures. Leading Polish politicians participate in the festivities; for example, in 2011 the President of Poland, Bronisław Komorowski, the Prime Minister of Poland, Donald Tusk, the Marshal of the Sejm, Grzegorz Schetyna, the Marshal of the Senate, Bogdan Borusewicz, and the Minister of National Defence, Bogdan Klich, took part in the festivities in Warsaw. The official festivities in Warsaw or in other Polish cities in the presence of the President and important dignitaries typically include flag flying, cannon salvos, a reading of the preamble of the constitution, and the singing of a patriotic song from the November Uprising, Witaj, majowa jutrzenko (Welcome, May Dawn), as well as drill shows and the annual military parade. Other events of the 2011 celebrations in Warsaw included a celebratory mass (see: The Most Holy Virgin Mary, Queen of Poland) in St. John's Archcathedral, Warsaw, and presidential awards for achievements in advancing Polish culture. Celebrations are also held in various other Polish cities.

Since 1892, the holiday has been a focal point of ethnic celebrations of Polish-American pride in the Chicago area, where it is known as Polish Constitution Day. Poles in Chicago have continued this tradition to the present day, marking it with festivities and the annual Polish Constitution Day Parade; guests of national stature, most notably Bobby Kennedy, have attended over the years to court the support of Chicago Polonia. In Minnesota, the first celebrations date to the 1870s. In San Francisco, the anniversary of the May 3rd Constitution has been observed annually for decades in the Music Concourse at Golden Gate Park. In Buffalo, New York, a Polish Happy Hour Buffalo event is held every 3 May at the Adam Mickiewicz Library, featuring Polish food and music and a reading of the preamble of the Polish Constitution in English and Polish.

== See also ==
- The Most Holy Virgin Mary, Queen of Poland — feast celebrated on the same day in Poland

== Notes ==
- a The claims of "first" and "second constitution" have been disputed. Indeed, both documents in question (US and Polish constitutions) were preceded by earlier ones, including those also labelled as constitutions, e.g., the Corsican Constitution of 1755.* See History of the constitution for more information.
