= Warsaw County (1999–2002) =

Former county of Poland

- County of the Masovian Voivodeship
- 1999–2002
- Capital: Warsaw
- Government
  - Type: County
- Alderman
  - 1999–2002: Edmund Ambroziak
- History
  - Established: 1 January 1999
  - Incorporation of Sulejówek and Wesoła: 1 January 2002
  - Disestablished: 27 October 2002
- Contained within
  - Country: Poland
  - Voivodeship: Masovian
- Political subdivisions: 11 municipalities (1999–2002); 13 municipalities (2002)
Preceded by	Succeeded by
Warsaw Voivodeship	Warsaw; Mińsk County

The Warsaw County (Polish: Powiat warszawski) was a county of the Masovian Voivodeship, Poland, consisting of the city of Warsaw, that existed from 1 January 1999 to 27 October 2002. It had an area of 536.5 km^{2}, making it the largest county in Poland.

== History ==
The county was established on 1 January 1999, in the administrative division reform, that disestablished former voivodeships of Poland, including the Warsaw Voivodeship, that existed in the area. The county was located in the Masovian Voivodeship, Poland, and consisted of the city of Warsaw. Both county and city administrations co-existed as separate entities.

On 1 January 2002, the county incorporated the towns of Sulejówek, and Wesoła, from neighboring Mińsk County. In 2002, it was decided to change the governing system of Warsaw, including the disestablishment of the county. As such, inhabitants of Sulejówek and Wesoła, were asked to vote on whether they wanted their towns to become part of Warsaw, or re-join the Mińsk County. As such, Wesoła become the district of Warsaw, while Sulejówek re-joined the Mińsk County.

The county was disestablished on 27 October 2002, with Warsaw becoming city county.

== Subdivisions ==
The county was divided into 11 urban gminas (municipalities). Those were:

- Warsaw-Bemowo;
- Warsaw-Białołęka;
- Warsaw-Bielany;
- Warsaw-Centre;
- Warsaw-Rembertów;
- Warsaw-Targówek;
- Warsaw-Ursus;
- Warsaw-Ursynów;
- Warsaw-Wawer;
- Warsaw-Wilanów;
- Warsaw-Włochy.

From to 1 January 2002, to 27 October 2002, it also included two independent towns, which were Sulejówek, and Wesoła.

Additionally, Warsaw-Centre municipality was divided into 7 districts.

== Leaders ==
The leader of the county had the title of an alderman. The only person in that office was Edmund Ambroziak, who served from 1999 to 2002.
