= Coat of arms of Warsaw =

Versions
- Design for Grand Coat of Arms of Warsaw ("Semper invicta")

- Coat of arms of Warsaw during the communist era (1944–1989)
- Armiger: Capital City of Warsaw
- Adopted: 1990
- Crest: Mermaid of Warsaw
- Motto: Contemnit procellas
- Earlier version: 1390-1989

The coat of arms of Warsaw (The Warsaw Mermaid) consists of a syrenka in a red field. This imagery has been in use since at least the mid-14th century. The syrenka has traditionally held a silver sword although this does not appear on more recent versions.

== History ==
The first coat of arms of Warsaw depicted a dragon with a male human head, carrying a sword and a shield. The first known usage was on a seal from 1390. This is the oldest existing armed seal of Warsaw, consisting of a round seal bordered with the Latin inscription Sigilium Civitatis Varsoviensis (Seal of the city of Warsaw). Gradually the male head and body was replaced with that of a female, and by the end of 16th century the tail was also changed from that of a dragon to that of a fish. The only remaining parts of the original coat of arms are the sword and shield.

Beginning in the early 17th century Warsaw records associate a sword-wielding mermaid with the city. Since 1622, the Warsaw arms have been rendered as a mermaid with sword and shield in hand, representing Melusina from the River Vistula (Wisła), who in legend led Duke Bolesław II of Masovia (1262–1313) to the appropriate site (a fishing village) and ordered him to found the city, in about 1294. The origin of the legendary figure is not fully known. The city's motto is, appropriately, Contemnit procellas ("It defies the storms").

== Modern usage ==
The current official design of the symbol was introduced in 1938 but it was only used in this form until the beginning of World War II. After 1945, Communist authorities changed the emblem by removing the crown. The insignia was restored to the pre-war form on August 15, 1990.

In addition there is a "Great Emblem of the Capital City of Warsaw" (Herb Wielki Miasta Stołecznego Warszawy) used only for ceremonial occasions. It includes a depiction of the Virtuti Militari medal, which was awarded to the City to honor the bravery of its citizens during World War II. It also adds the second motto to the emblem — Semper invicta (Always invincible).

Every member of the Queen's Royal Hussars of the United Kingdom light cavalry wears the Maid of Warsaw, the crest of the City of Warsaw, on the left sleeve of his No. 2 (Service) Dress. Members of 651 Squadron Army Air Corps of the United Kingdom also wear the Maid of Warsaw on the left sleeve of their No. 2 (Service) Dress.

== Statues and sculptures ==
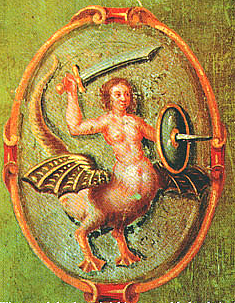
The 1659 coat of arms of Old Warsaw on the cover of one of Warsaw's accounting books

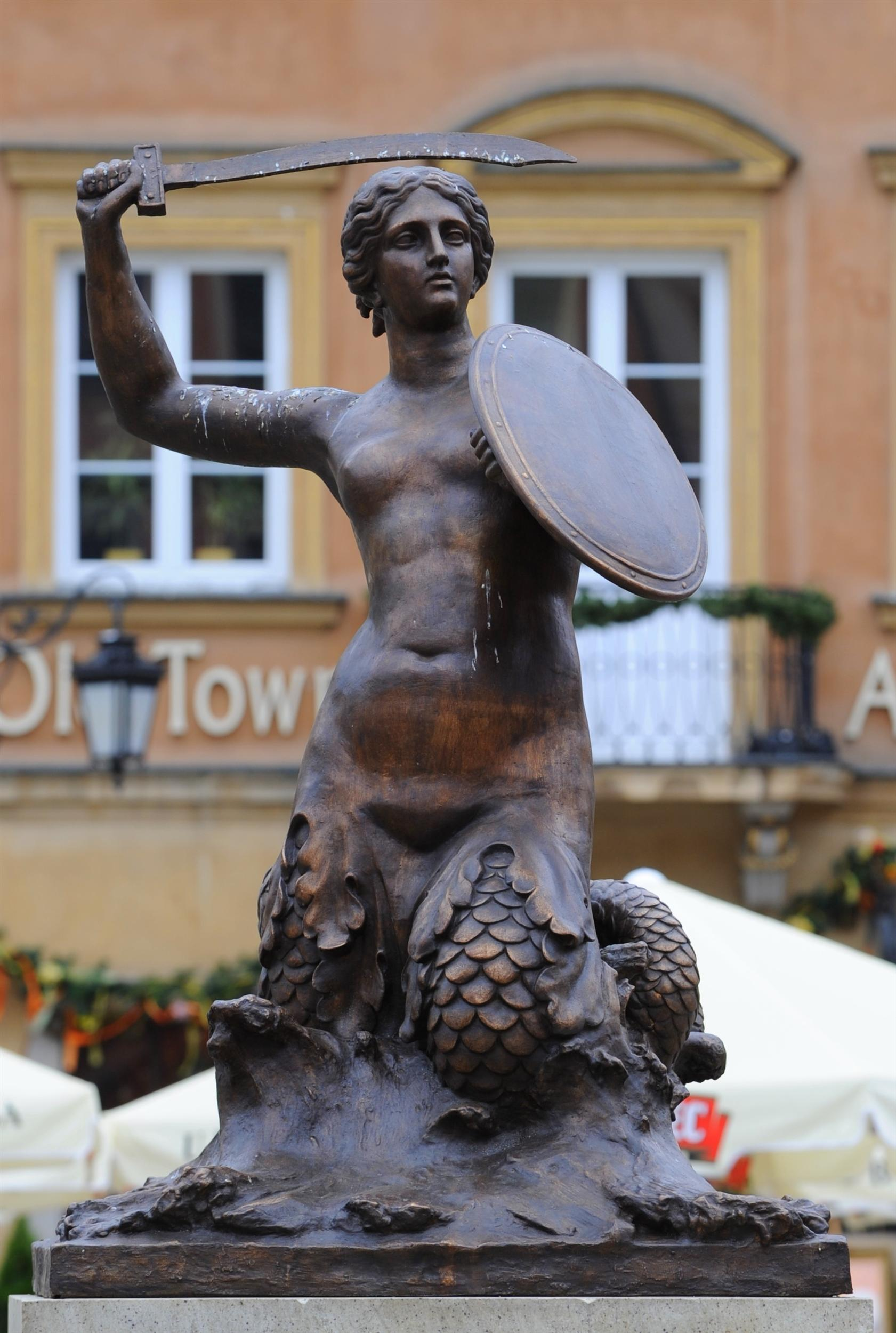
Syrenka statue on Old Town Market square in Warsaw

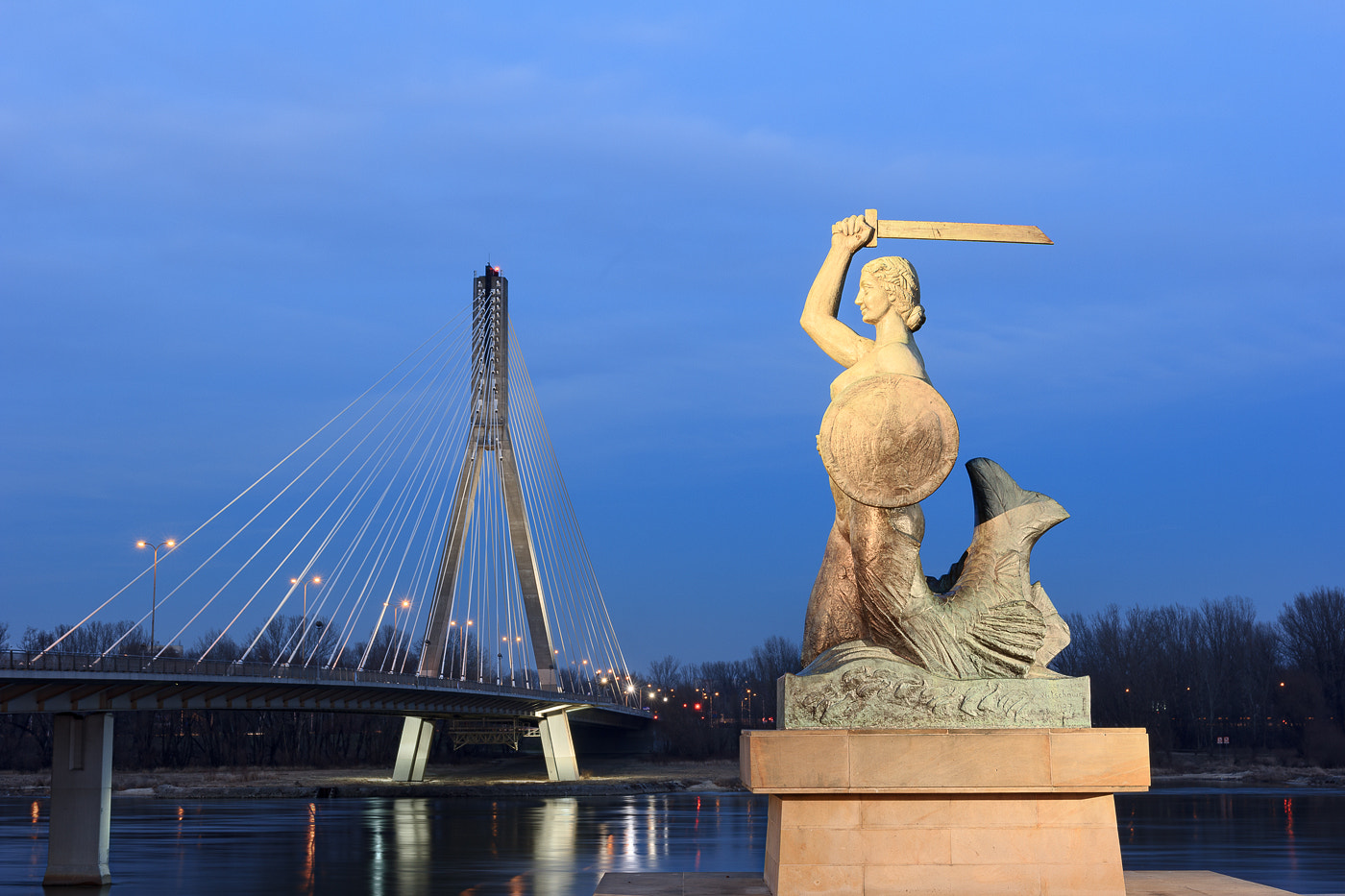
Syrenka on Powiśle

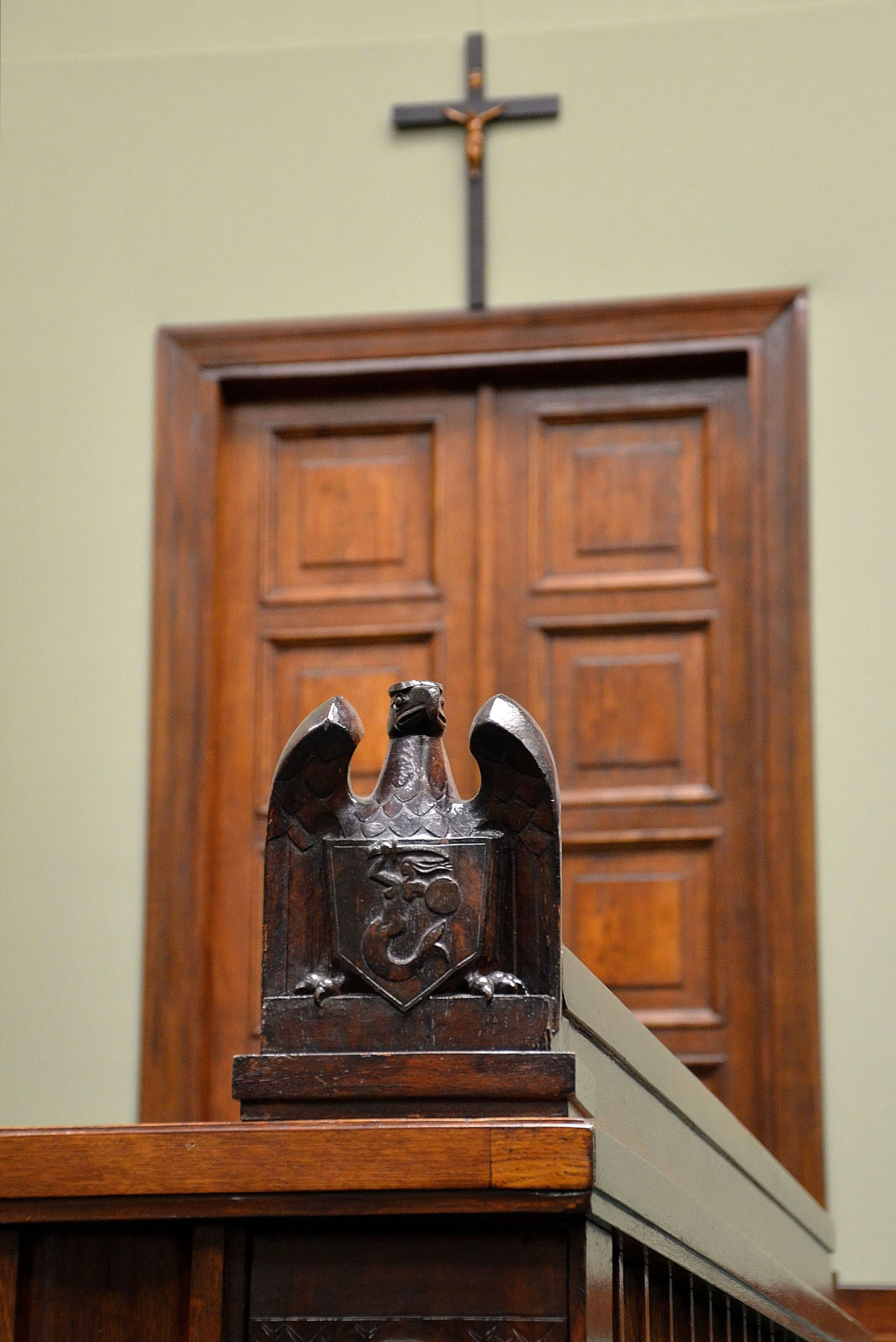
Syrenka in the Sejm's Plenary Hall wisła POLANDER

== See also ==
- Flag of Warsaw
- Monument to the Heroes of Warsaw
- Warsaw Unicorn
