= Flag of Poland =

Republic of Poland
- Flag of the Republic of Poland
- Use: National flag
- Proportion: 5:8
- Adopted: 1 August 1919; 107 years ago (de jure)
- Design: A horizontal bicolour of white and red
- Flag with coat of arms of the Republic of Poland
- Use: State flag, civil and state ensign
- Proportion: 5:8
- Adopted: 1919; last modified 1990
- Design: A horizontal bicolour of white and red defaced with the arms of Poland in the white stripe.
- Use: Naval ensign
- Proportion: 10:21
- Adopted: 19 February 1993; 33 years ago
- Design: A flag consisting of two stripes, white and red, terminated in two triangular tongues on a free leech. In the center of the white strip, in the part between the louvre and the apex of the indentation between the tongues, is the emblem of the Republic of Poland.
- Pennant of the president of the Republic of Poland
- Use: Presidential standard
- Proportion: 5:6
- Adopted: 1919 (original); 1927 (officially); 26 January 1996 (restored)
- Design: Crowned white eagle in a red field bordered with a white wavy line.

The national flag of Poland (flaga Polski [ˈfla.ɡa ˈpɔl.ski]) consists of two horizontal stripes of equal width, the upper one white and the lower one red. The two colours are defined in the Polish constitution as the national colours. A variant of the flag with the national coat of arms in the middle of the white fess is legally reserved for official use abroad and at sea. A similar flag with the addition of a white eagle is used as the naval ensign of Poland.

White and red were officially adopted as national colours in 1831, although these were associated with Poland since the Middle Ages and were emphasized on royal banners. They are of heraldic origin and derive from the tinctures (colours) of the coats of arms of the two constituent nations of the Polish–Lithuanian Commonwealth (i.e., the White Eagle of Poland, and the Pursuer of the Grand Duchy of Lithuania, a white knight riding a white horse), both on a red shield. The flag was one of the only three flags of a socialist country in Europe without its coat of arms in the center.

Until 1831, Polish soldiers wore cockades of various colour combinations. The national flag was officially adopted in 1919. Since 2004, Polish Flag Day has been celebrated on 2 May.

The flag is flown continuously on the buildings of the highest national authorities, such as the parliament and the presidential palace. Other institutions and many Polish people fly the national flag on national holidays and other special occasions of national significance. Current Polish law does not restrict the use of the national flag without the coat of arms, as long as the flag is not disrespected.

Horizontal bicolours of white and red being a relatively widespread design, several flags are similar but unrelated to the Polish one. Two national flags (Indonesia and Monaco) have the red stripe above the white one. In Poland, many flags based on the national design also feature the national colours.

It is one of five flags that use the 5:8 ratio. The other four flags include those of Argentina, Guatemala, Palau, and Sweden.

== Design ==
Horizontal and vertical display of the colours of the Republic of Poland

=== Legal sources ===
The colours and flags of the Republic of Poland are described in two legal documents: the Constitution of the Republic of Poland of 1997 and the Coat of Arms, Colours and Anthem of the Republic of Poland and State Seals Act (Ustawa o godle, barwach i hymnie Rzeczypospolitej Polskiej oraz o pieczęciach państwowych) of 1980 with subsequent amendments (henceforth referred to as "the Coat of Arms Act").

Legislation concerning the national symbols is far from perfect. The Coat of Arms Act has been amended several times and refers extensively to executive ordinances, some of which have never been issued. Moreover, the Act contains errors, omissions and inconsistencies which make the law confusing, open to various interpretations and often not followed in practice.

=== National colours ===
Statutory coordinates of Polish national colours in the CIE xyY colour space with the tolerated colour differences in CIELUV
Colour (Note: Statutory colour specifications rendered into sRGB for web display, assuming the white point at 6500 K. The resulting RGB values, in hexadecimal notation, are: white #E9E8E7 and red #D4213D. The shades actually visible on your screen depend on your browser and screen settings, as well as the surrounding context and other factors. An intensely luminous light background may make the statutory white colour appear grey. Many websites which display the Polish national colours use a simplified approximation of the legally specified shades by using basic HTML colours: white #FFFFFF and red #FF0000. The Pantone equivalents are 656 C and 1795 C.)	x	y	Y	ΔE
White	0.315	0.320	82.0	4.0
Red	0.570	0.305	16.0	8.0
Illuminant C, measurement geometry d/0

According to Chapter I, Article 28, paragraph 2 of the Constitution, the national colours of Poland are white and red. The Coat of Arms Act, Article 4, further specifies that the colours are white and red in two horizontal, parallel stripes of equal width, of which the top one is white and the bottom one is red. If the colours are displayed vertically, the white stripe is placed on the left from the onlooker's viewpoint. Attachment no. 2 to the Act shows the national colours in both horizontal and vertical alignment, as well as the official shades of both colours expressed as coordinates in the CIE xyY (CIE 1931) colour space with the tolerated colour differences (ΔE) specified in the CIE 1976 (L*, u*, v*) colour space (CIELUV).

Variant of Polish flag per statute, with crimson and darker white

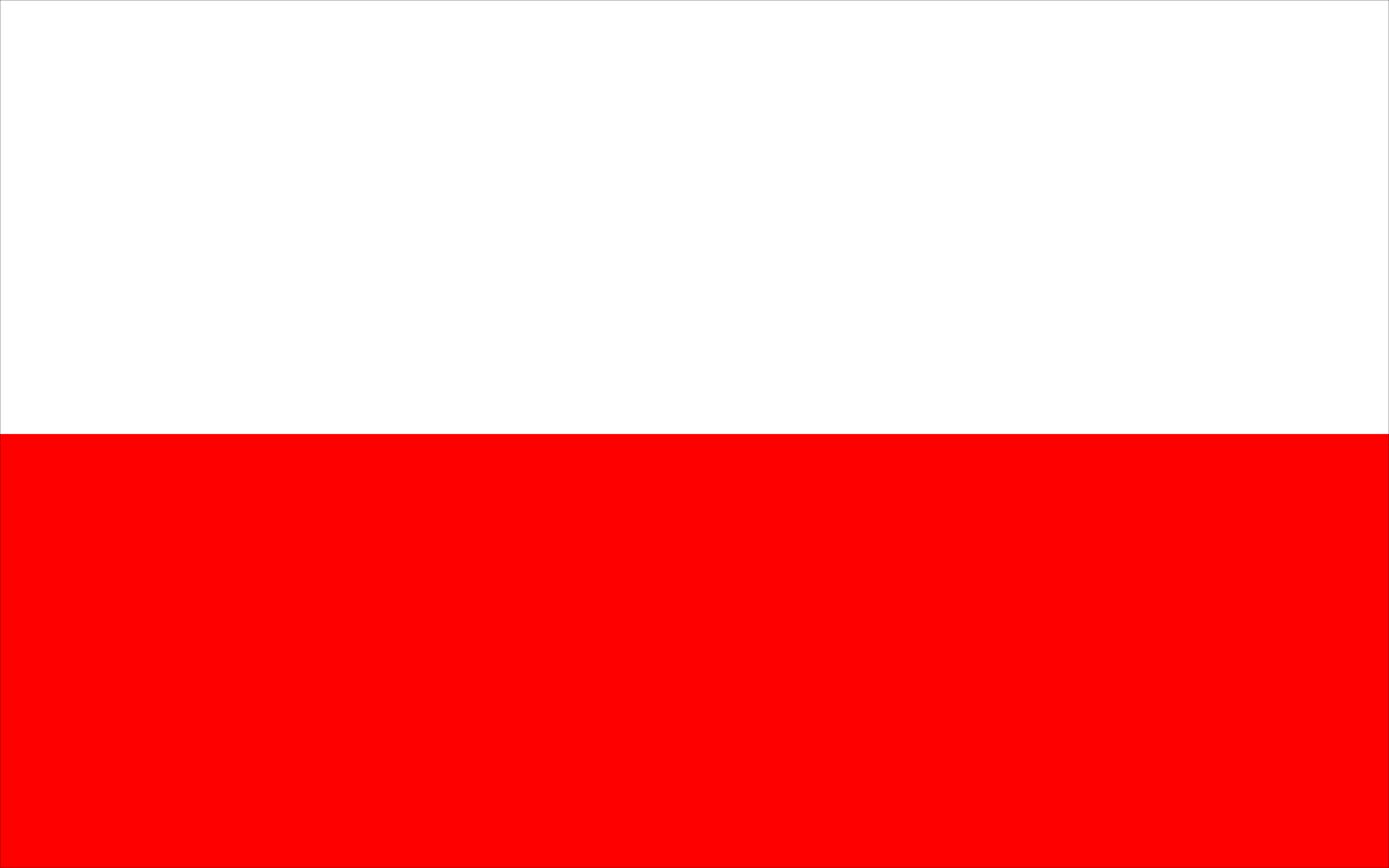
Variant of Polish flag with bare RGB colours

=== Variants of the national flag ===
An unofficial construction sheet of the flag with coat of arms, based on specifications in Polish law

The Constitution contains no mention of a national flag. Instead, the flag is defined by the Coat of Arms Act which specifies two variants of the national flag: the national flag of the Republic of Poland (flaga państwowa Rzeczypospolitej Polskiej) and the national flag with coat of arms of the Republic of Poland (flaga państwowa z godłem Rzeczypospolitej Polskiej). Both flags are defined in Article 6 of the act as follows:

1. The state flag of the Republic of Poland is a rectangular piece of cloth in the colours of the Republic of Poland hoisted on a flagpole.
2. The state flag of the Republic of Poland is also the flag specified in paragraph 1, with the coat of arms of the Republic of Poland placed in the middle of the white stripe.

The hoist to fly ratio for both flags is 5:8. For the latter flag, the proportion between the inescutcheon of the coat of arms and the hoist is 2:5. Images of both variations of the flag can be found in attachment no. 3 to the Coat of Arms Act.

== Usage ==
=== Right and obligation to fly the flag ===
Per Polish law, treating the national symbols, including the flag, "with reverence and respect" is the "right and obligation" of every Polish citizen and all state organs, institutions and organisations. Public disrespect, destruction or intentional removal of the flag is considered a crime punishable by a fine, penal servitude or up to one year of imprisonment. Official statistics show that crimes against national symbols are rare: 43 such crimes in 2003 and 96 in 2004 were less than 0.001% of all crimes registered in Poland in those years. Other, unspecified violation of regulations on the Polish flag is an infraction, punishable by a fine or up to one month imprisonment.

According to the Coat of Arms Act, everyone can use the Polish flag, especially during national and cultural events, as long as it is done in a respectful manner. This liberty in the use of national colours is a relative novelty. Until 2004, Polish citizens were only allowed to fly the Polish flag on national holidays. The use of both variants was restricted, but only flying the flag with coat of arms was, from 1955 to 1985, punishable by a fine or arrest for up to one year. After 1985, unauthorised use of any national symbol was an infraction. A possible explanation to such harsh measures was that the officially promoted holiday of 1 May was separated by only one day from the pre-war (and current) national holiday of Poland, the anniversary of signing of the Constitution of 3 May 1791. While hoisting a flag on 1 May was acceptable, no later than the following day it had to be taken down.

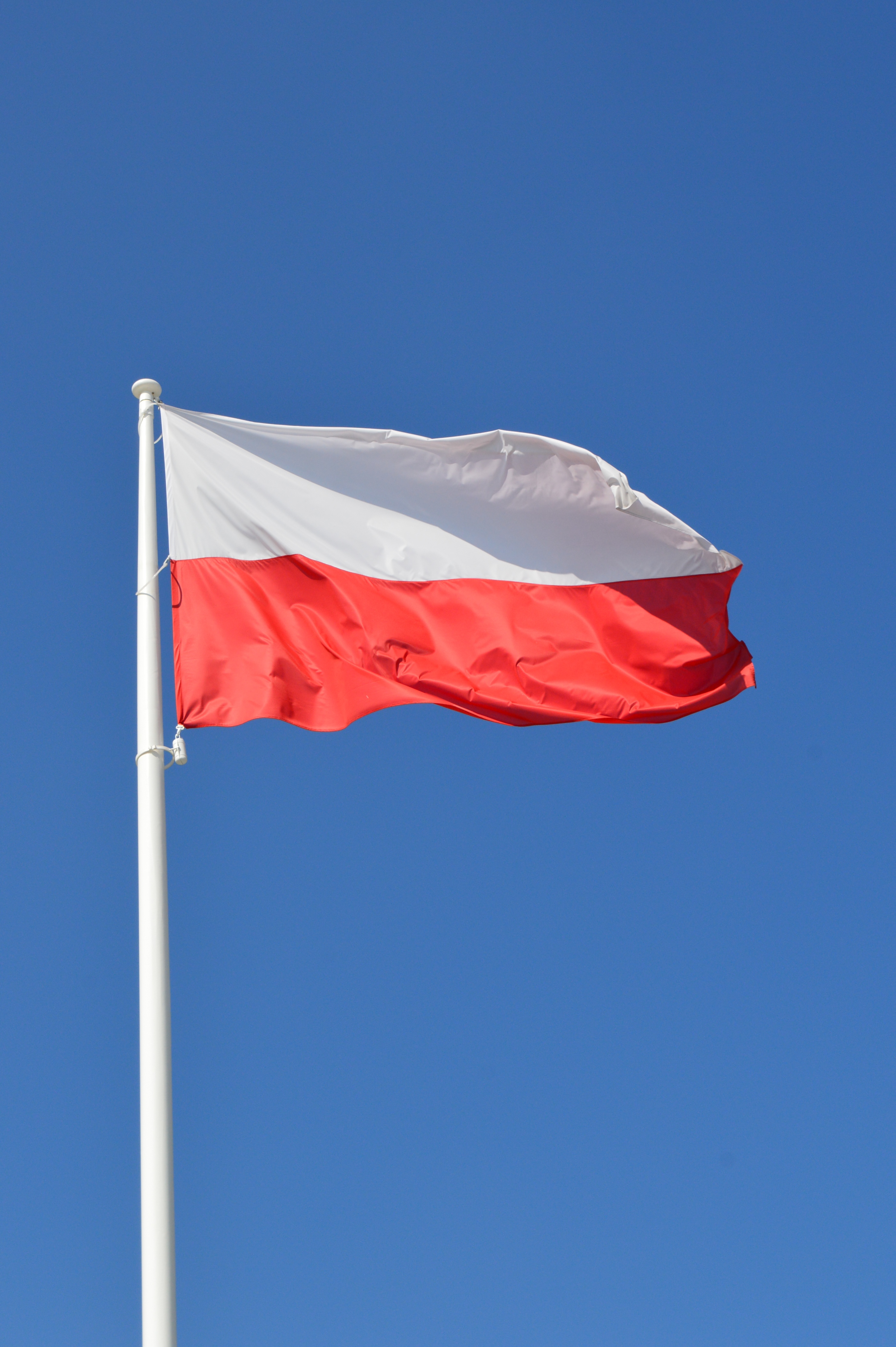
Flag without the coat of arms

That restriction and kind of state monopoly on the use of national symbols during the Communist regime made flying the Polish flag a symbol of resistance against the government. It became customary, as it still is, for workers to hoist Polish flags on plant buildings when going on strike. Hence, the Polish flag, as a symbol of patriotism and resistance against Communist rule, is part of the Solidarity trade union logo.

==== Flag without coat of arms ====
The following institutions are required by law to fly the national flag without coat of arms either on top or in front of their official buildings:

- the Sejm (lower house of parliament);
- the Senat (upper house of parliament);
- the President of the Republic;
- the Council of Ministers (cabinet) and the President of the Council of Ministers (Prime Minister);
- Voivodeship sejmiks (provincial legislatures);
- other state and local government organs.

Additionally, the national flag without coat of arms is used as an ensign for inland navigation.

==== Flag with coat of arms ====
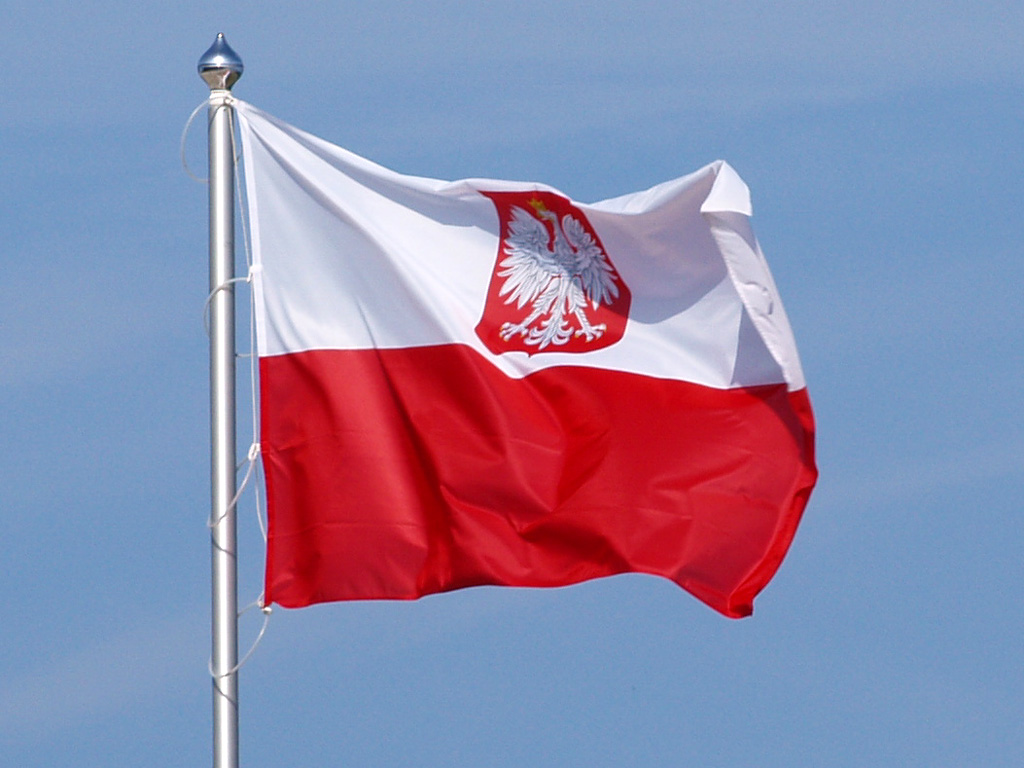
Flag with the coat of arms

While the ban on using the flag without coat of arms has been lifted, the use of the national flag with coat of arms is still legally restricted and should be flown only:

- on or in front of Polish embassies, consulates and other representative offices and missions abroad, as well as by Polish ambassadors and consuls on their residences and vehicles;
- at civilian airports and heliports (civil air ensign);
- on civilian airplanes – only during international flights;
- on buildings of seaport authorities;
- as a merchant (civil) ensign.

In practice, however, the restriction is often ignored and the two flags, with and without the coat of arms, are treated as interchangeable. The variant with the coat of arms, even though its incorrect usage, is often used by the Polonia, or Polish diaspora outside Poland, especially in the United States.

=== Flag flying days ===
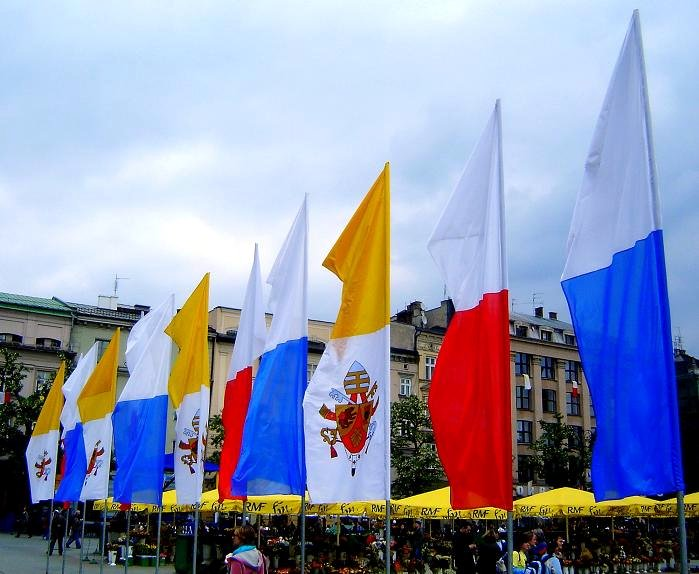
The Polish, Papal (yellow and white) and Municipal (white and blue) flags in Kraków's Grand Square during Pope Benedict XVI's visit to Poland on 27 May 2006

State and local government organs are legally required, and other institutions and organisations as well as all citizens are encouraged to fly the Polish flag on the following days:

- 1 May – State Holiday (May Day, formerly Labor Day);
- 2 May – Polish National Flag Day;
- 3 May – Constitution Day (along with Polish National Flag Day);
- 11 November – Independence Day.

=== Common flag practice ===
The flag is often popularly flown during important sporting events, such as the FIFA World Cup, if Polish athletes are participating; and during an official visit of a particularly important person, especially a pope, in Poland. During a pope's visit, the national flag is usually flown together with yellow and white Church flags, and white and blue Marian flags. It is uncommon to fly the national flag on personal occasions, such as birthdays or weddings.

According to polls, about one out of three Poles say they own a Polish flag, and about one out of four fly it on national holidays. Such public display of patriotism is much more common in western Poland, especially in Greater Poland, than in other parts of the country.

== Flag protocol ==
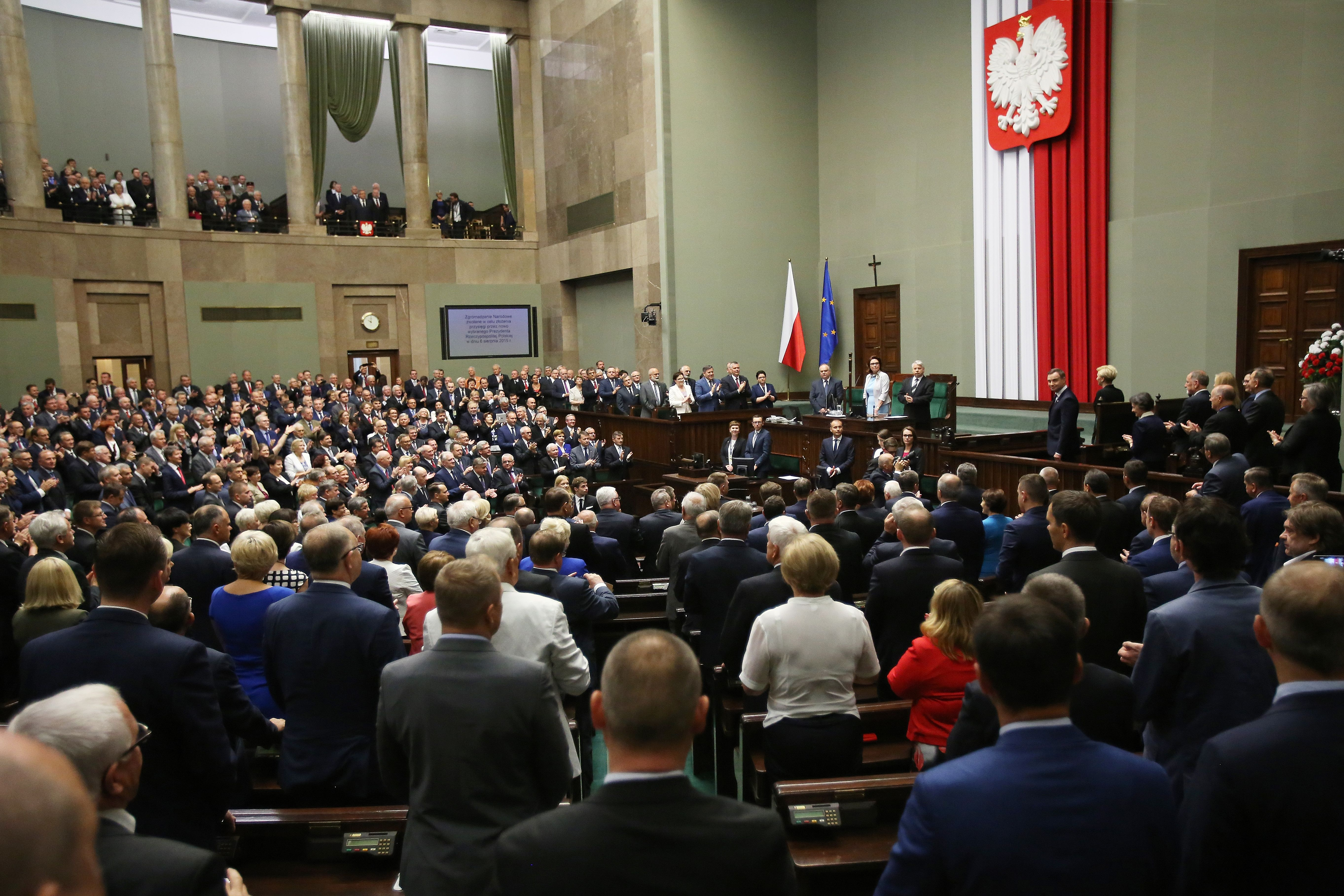
Example of vertical alignment of Polish national colours inside the Sejm chamber

Flags in Poland are used according to a customary, rather than legal, flag protocol. Apart from the obligation to treat the flag with due respect, Polish law does not offer a detailed code of correct usage of the Polish flag. Some organisations and public institutions, such as the Heraldic and Vexillological Institute and the Supreme Chamber of Control have proposed written flag protocols for the Polish flag, based on custom, flag protocols of other countries such as India and the United States, and common sense. These guidelines, however, are not legally binding.

Traditionally, the national flag is reserved to serve either informative or festive purposes. A single specimen of the flag on or in front of a public office building indicates its official role. Multiple flags, on the other hand, are normally used to decorate both public and private buildings to mark special occasions, such as national holidays.

In Polish heraldry, the tincture of the charge has priority in relation to the tincture of the field. In the case of Polish national colours, white, the colour of the White Eagle, should always be placed in a more honorable position than red, the colour of the field of the Polish coat of arms. In the most usual, horizontal alignment, this means that the white stripe is placed above the red one. If the alignment is vertical, the white stripe should be on the left from the onlooker's point of view. If the flag is hung vertically above a street, the white stripe should be placed on the left when looking in the direction of increasing house numbers. If it drapes a coffin, the white stripe should be placed over the heart.

The flag should be raised before 8 a.m. and lowered at sunset, and if flown at night, it should be illuminated. During a ceremonial raising of the flag, the national anthem is played so that the timing of the raising matches the duration of the anthem. Civilians pay respect by standing in a dignified manner; additionally, men uncover their heads. Members of uniformed services stand at attention; if their uniform includes headgear and they are not standing in an organised group, they also perform the two-finger salute. Colour guards dip their banners to the flag. (See video)

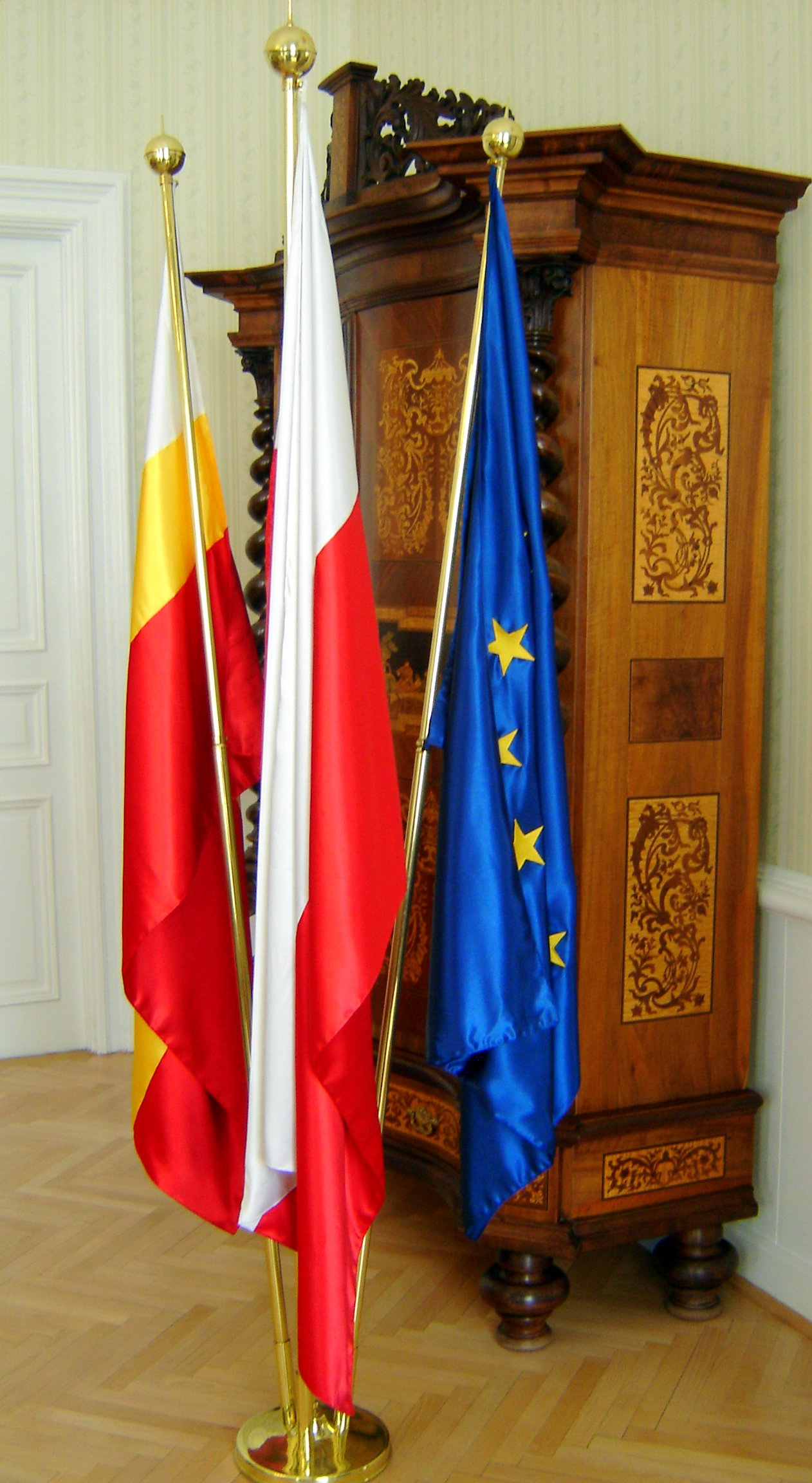
Example of indoor display of the flag of Poland (center) together with other flags: that of the Lesser Poland Voivodeship (left) and the European flag (right)

According to generally accepted standards of respect, the national flag should never be dipped to any person or thing. Care should be taken to prevent the flag from touching the ground, floor or water beneath it. It should be also secured from being torn off or falling to the ground and it should not be flown outdoors during a heavy rain, blizzard or very strong wind. The flag should never be flown dirty, torn or faded. When no longer in a fit condition to be used, it should be disposed of in a dignified manner, preferably by cutting it in half so as to separate the colours and then, burning.

When displayed with other flags, the Polish flag should be raised first and lowered last. Each flag must be flown from a separate pole of the same height, but the flag of Poland should be always placed in the most honorable position. It means that if the total number of flags is even, the Polish flag should be placed to the right of the other flags. If the total number of flags is odd, it should be placed in the middle. Alternatively, two Polish flags may be placed, one at each end of the row of flags. The order of precedence for flags is as follows:

- flag of Poland,
- national flags of other countries (in alphabetical order),
- voivodeship flags,
- county flags,
- commune flags,
- European flag,
- flags of domestic organisations,
- flags of international organisations,
- public services flags,
- corporate flags,
- other flags.

The President of the Republic may announce a period of national mourning. During that time Polish flags are flown at half-staff. If a flag is flown from a wooden pole rather than a staff or mast, a black ribbon is attached to the pole as a sign of mourning or a black flag is flown to its left from the national flag.

== History ==
=== Royal banner ===
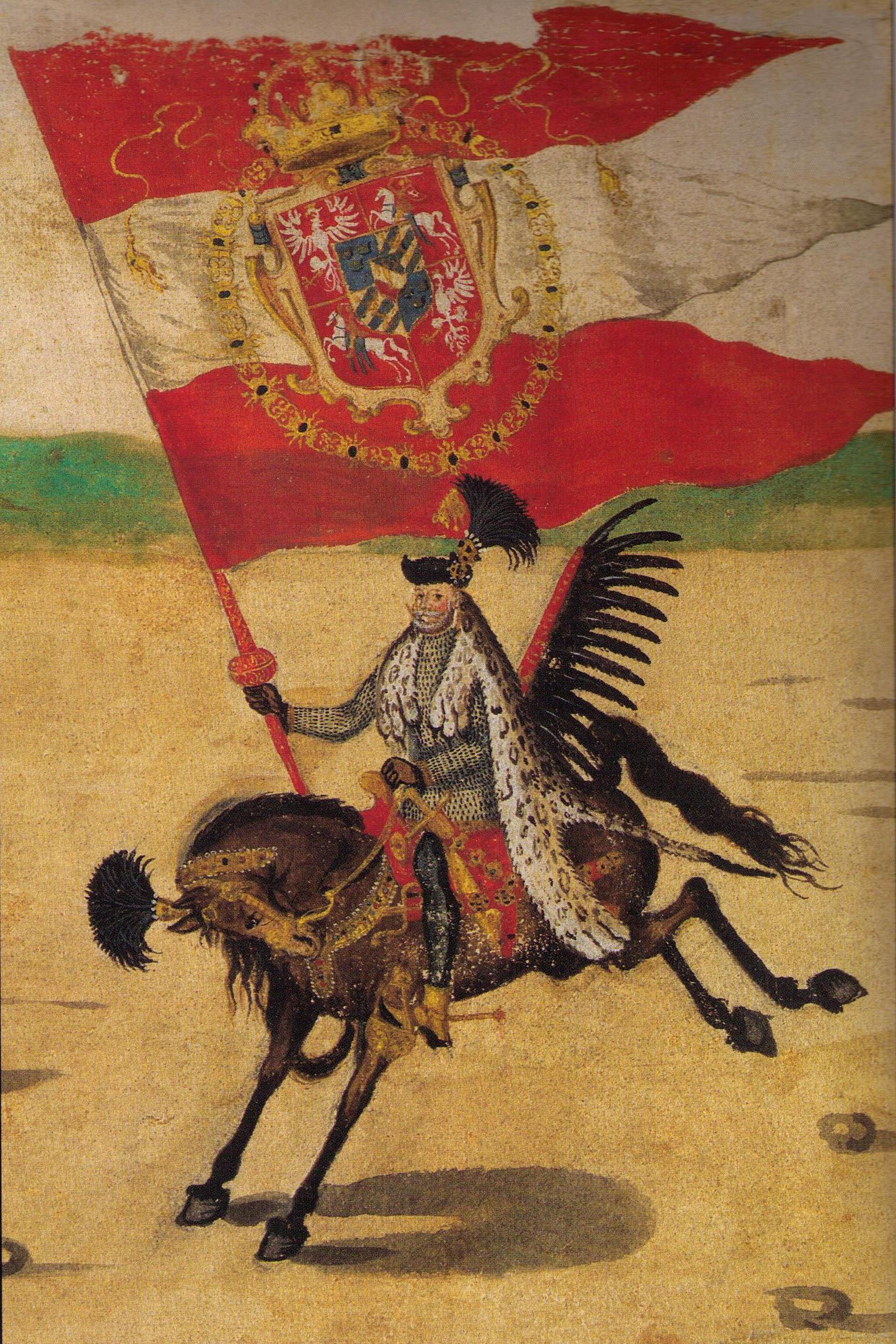
Stanisław Sobieski, Grand Standard Bearer of the Polish Crown, carrying King Sigismund III's double-swallow-tailed royal banner consisting of red and white stripes emblazoned with a coat of arms combining the heraldic symbols of Poland, Lithuania, Sweden and the House of Vasa (c. 1605)

The earliest vexilloids (flag-like objects) used in Poland were known as stanice and probably resembled the Roman vexillum, that is a cloth draped vertically from a horizontal crosspiece attached to a wooden pole or spear. They served as both religious and military symbols as early as 10th century. With Poland's conversion to Christianity in 966, the stanice were probably Christianized by replacing pagan symbols with Christian ones. The royal banner of arms dates back to the reign of King Boleslaus the Generous (r. 1076–1079), but it was during the reign of King Ladislaus the Short (r. 1320–1333) that a red cloth emblazoned with the White Eagle of the arms of Poland was finally established as the Banner of the Kingdom of Poland, a symbol of royal authority used at coronations and in battles.

In the times of the Polish–Lithuanian Commonwealth (1569–1795), a banner of the Commonwealth was also used, combining the heraldic symbols of Poland and the Grand Duchy of Lithuania. The Commonwealth banner was initially plain white emblazoned with the arms of the Commonwealth which consisted of the heraldic charges of Poland (White Eagle) and Lithuania (Pursuer). Since both Polish and Lithuanian coats of arms consisted of white (Argent) charges in a red (Gules) field, these two colours started to be used for the entire banner. During the 17th century, the banner was usually divided into two, three or four horizontal, often swallow-tailed, stripes of red and white.

=== National cockade ===
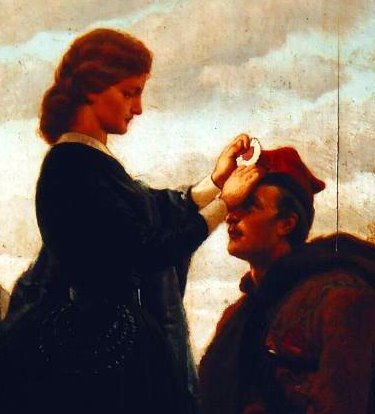
A woman fastening a red-and-white cockade to a Polish insurgent's square-shaped rogatywka cap during the January Uprising of 1863–1864

In the 18th and 19th centuries, European nations used cockades, or knots of coloured ribbons pinned to the hat, to denote the nationality of their military. In Poland, until 1831, there was no consensus as to what the colours of the national cockade should be. Polish soldiers wore white, white-and-red, blue-and-red or blue-white-red cockades.

The custom came to Poland from Saxony during the reign of Augustus II (r. 1697–1733), King of Poland and Elector of Saxony. During that time, the cockade worn by the Polish military had, like in Saxony, the form of a white silk ribbon with a knot in the middle. It was later replaced with a circular white cockade wrinkled toward the center, patterned after the cockade of the Kingdom of France. During the reign of King Stanislaus Augustus (r. 1764–1795), a white-and-red cockade came into use alongside the plain white one. In 1791, the Military Commission introduced a metal cross pattée as a more durable alternative to the cockade. However, many soldiers continued to either pin the cross to the cockade or wear the cockade without the cross. Polish military leaders and national heroes of the time, such as General Tadeusz Kościuszko and Prince Józef Poniatowski pinned plain white "national" cockades to their hats.

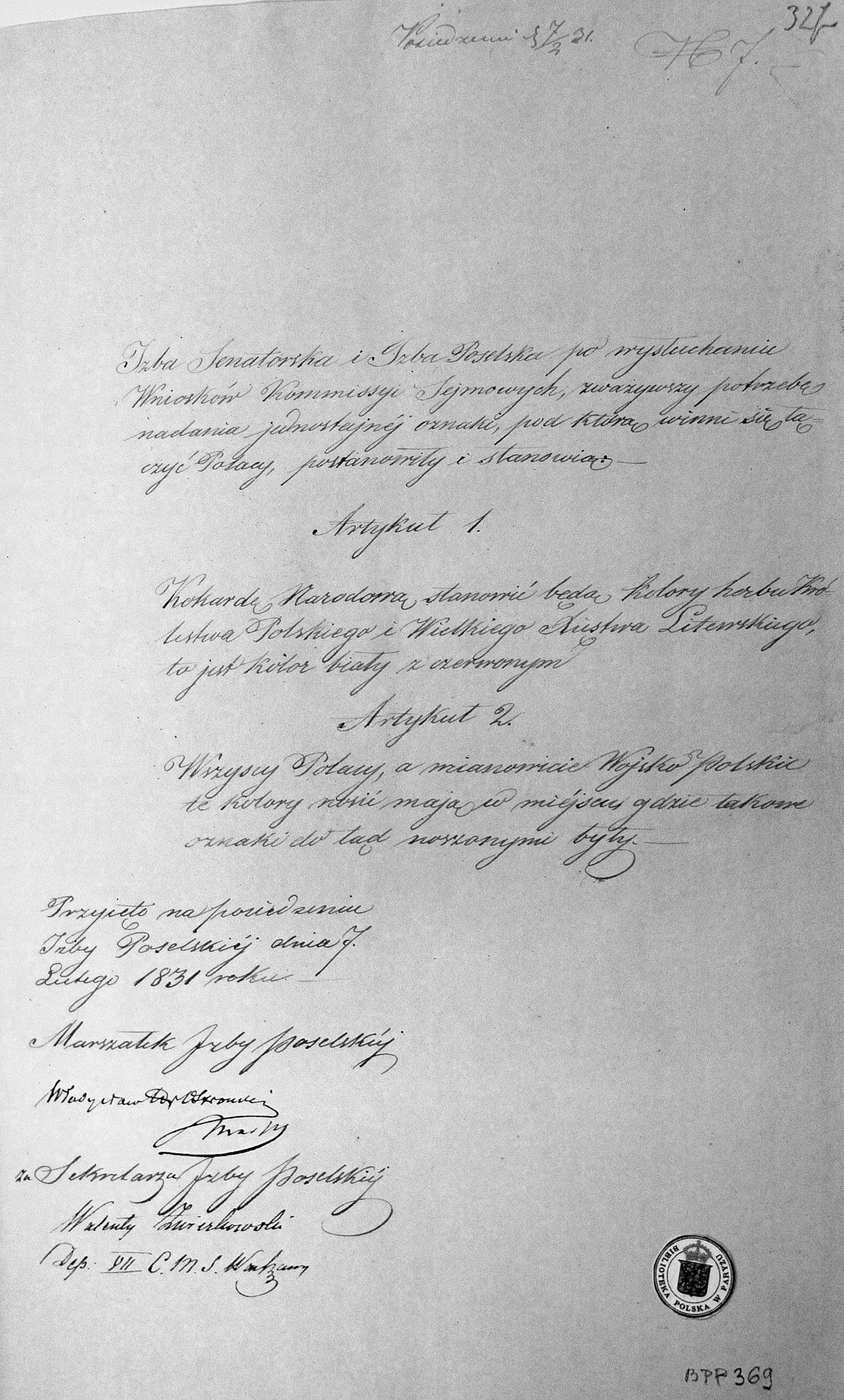
National Cockade Act of 7 February 1831

Polish-Lithuanian coat of arms during the November Uprising of 1830–1831

The patriotic and staunchly Catholic members of the Bar Confederation of 1768–1772 adopted crimson – the symbol of Polish szlachta, or nobility – and blue – symbolizing Virgin Mary – as their colours. These, as well as white-and-red, were considered national colours during the Great Sejm of 1788–1792. White and red were first publicly used as national colours by civilians on 3 May 1792 in Warsaw, during a celebration of the first anniversary of the adoption of the Constitution of 1791. Meanwhile, the political left wore the blue-white-red cockades of the French Revolution. Polish Legions created in 1797 in French-controlled republics in Italy, used either national cockades of the particular Italian republics in which they served or the French tricolour cockade. In the latter case, the red and blue colours were replaced with crimson and navy blue respectively, hues considered to be traditionally Polish. The General Confederation of the Kingdom of Poland, which sought to revive the Polish-Lithuanian Commonwealth during the French invasion of Russia in 1812, adopted red-and-blue cockades, symbolizing the unity of Poland (red) and Lithuania (blue). The military of the French-controlled Duchy of Warsaw (1807–1815) and the Russian-controlled Congress Kingdom of Poland (1815–1831) used the white cockade, which was also worn by the cadets who started the November Uprising against Russian rule on 29 November 1830.

During the uprising, the Sejm realized the need for unified national insignia that could be used by the Polish military. On 7 February 1831 it adopted white and red, the tinctures (colours) of the Polish and Lithuanian coats of arms, as the national cockade of Poland. The white-and-red cockade was henceforth worn by Polish soldiers in the November Uprising, as well as by participants of the Kraków Uprising of 1846, Polish freedom fighters in the Grand Duchy of Posen and the Austrian Empire during the Spring of Nations of 1848, and Polish insurgents during the January Uprising of 1863–1864. White and red colours were also used by civilians to show their protest against the Russian rule, as well as by people in France, Britain, Germany, Belgium and other countries as a sign of their sympathy with the Polish cause. The Sejm's decision was not, however, immediately accepted by all. Left-wing politicians of the time, such as Joachim Lelewel, continued to regard the revolutionary blue, white and red as true national colours. Tricolour standards were used by some Polish guerrilla units during the January Uprising.

=== Twentieth century ===
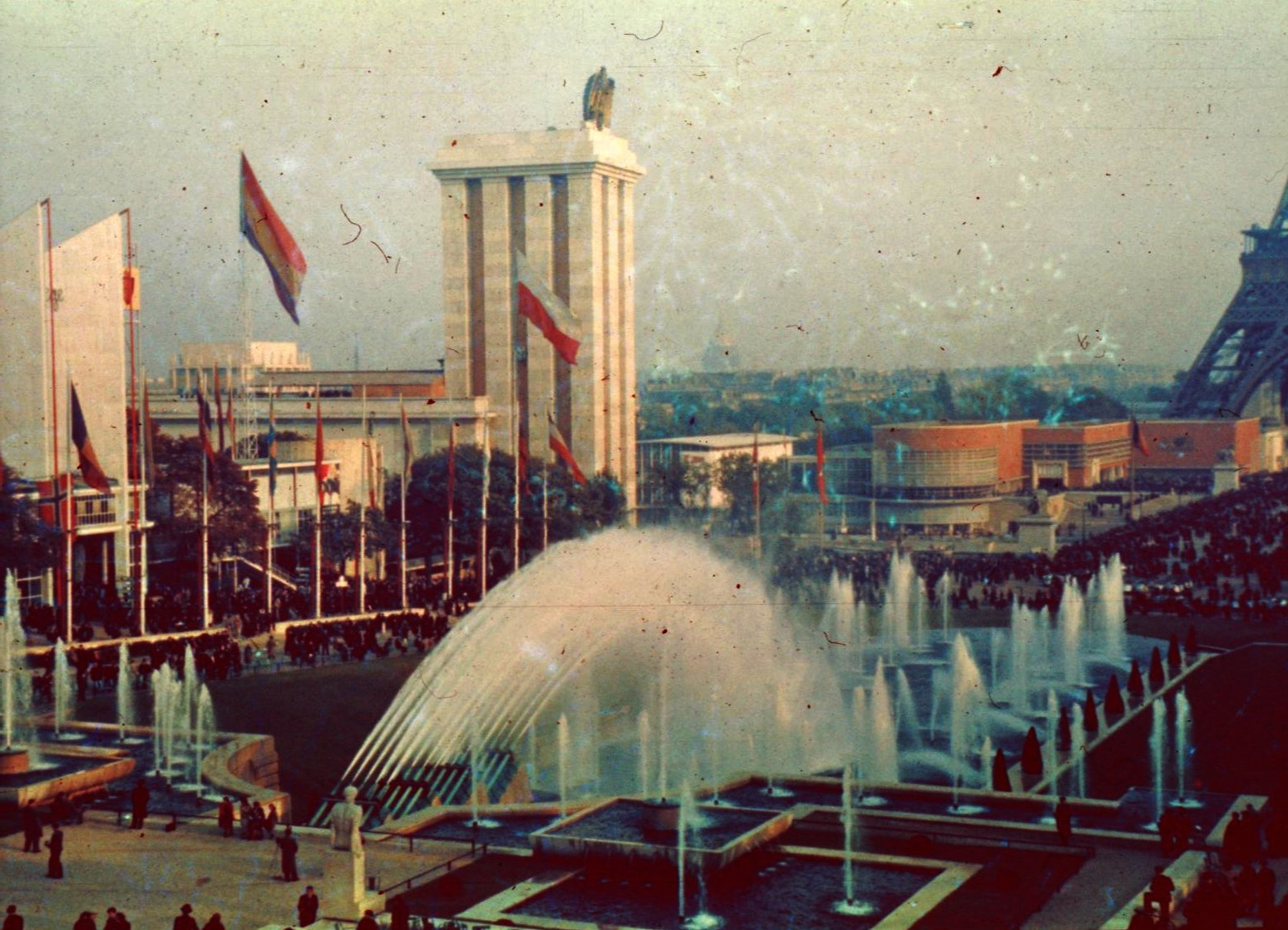
The flag of Poland in 1937

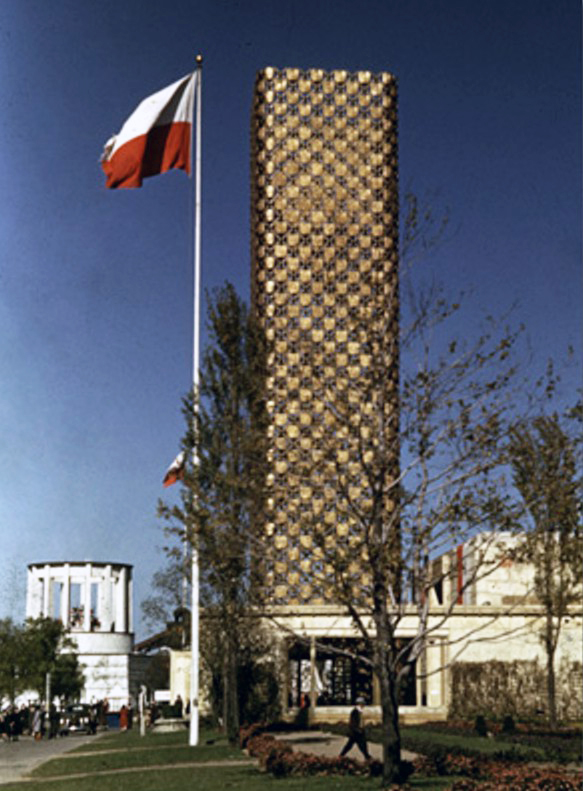
The flag of Poland in 1939

White-and-red flags were first waved during a patriotic demonstration on 3 May 1916 in Warsaw. The organizing committee advised participants about the correct alignment of the colours, that is with the white stripe above the red one. Still, many demonstrators brought flags with the red stripe on top. On 1 August 1919, almost a year after Poland regained independence in November 1918, the Sejm officially introduced a white-and-red bicolour as the Polish national flag. In order to avoid confusion with the white-and-red maritime signal flag used internationally by harbor pilots and tugboats, the same act of Sejm introduced a variant of the flag with the coat of arms in the white stripe for use as a civil ensign and by Polish diplomats and consuls abroad.

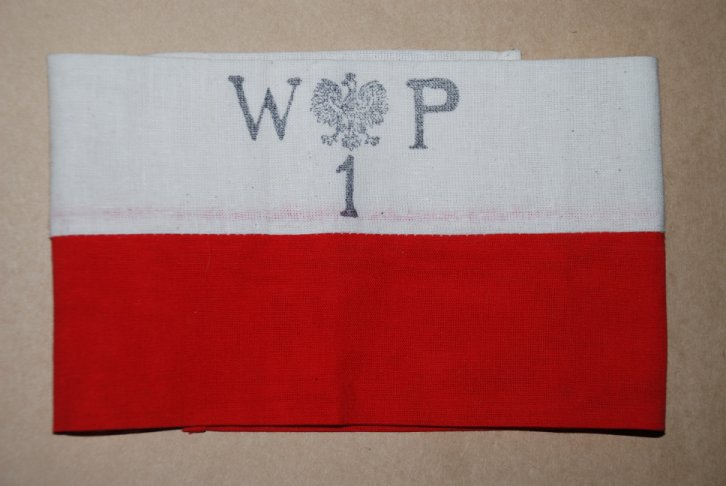
A white-and-red brassard worn by a Polish insurgent during the Warsaw Uprising of 1944. The acronym WP stands for Wojsko Polskie or Polish Armed Forces.

Apart from changes in the legal specifications of the shades of the national colours (see the section below), the basic design of the Polish flag, including the 5:8 ratio, has remained unchanged to this day. The flag with coat of arms was only modified to adjust to the changes in the coat of arms itself. Major modifications included a change in the stylisation of the eagle from Classicist to Baroque in 1927 and the removal of the crown from the eagle's head during the Communist rule from 1944 to 1990. In that period, Poland was one of the few socialist states in the Eastern Bloc (apart from the flag of Cuba and Laos) not to adorn communist symbolism on its flag.

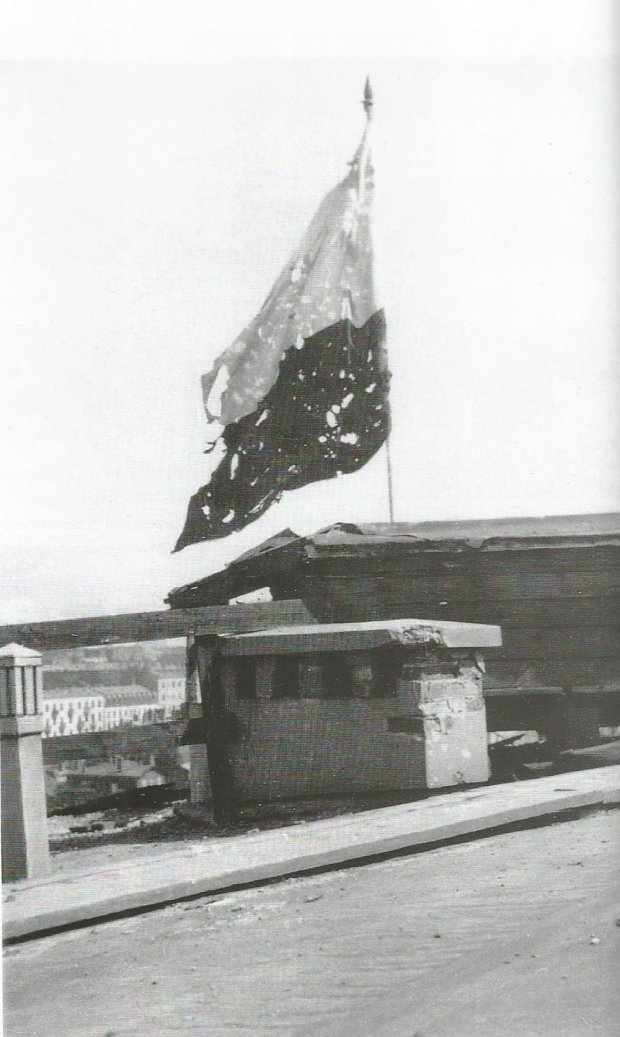
A frayed Polish flag during the final days of the Warsaw Uprising of 1944

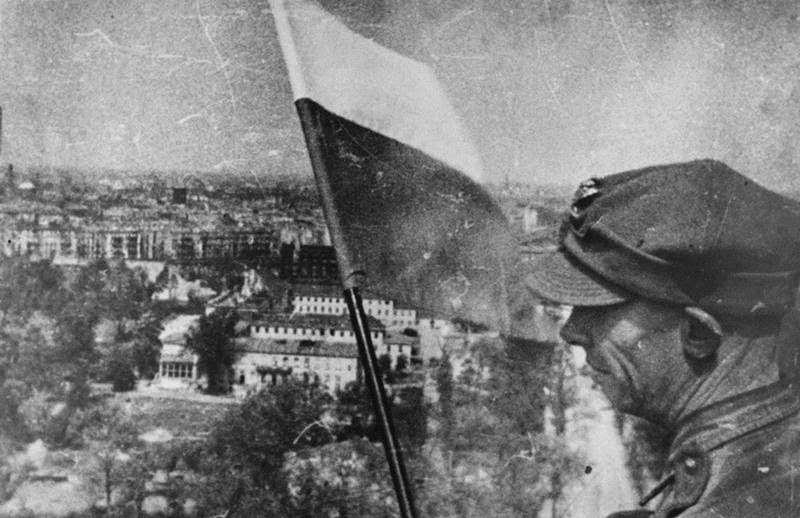
Polish flag in Berlin on 2 May 1945

20th-century Polish insurgents wore white-and-red brassards (armbands) which played a role similar to the cockade of previous centuries. Such armbands were worn by Polish freedom fighters during the Greater Poland Uprising (1918–1919) and Silesian Uprisings (1919–1921), as well as during the Second World War (1939–1945) by the soldiers of the Home Army (AK) and Peasants' Battalions (BCh) – usually emblazoned with the acronyms of their formations. During the Second World War, Polish soldiers raised the Polish flag on several sites of their victories. On 18 May 1944, after an Allied victory over the German forces in the Battle of Monte Cassino, a patrol of the 12th Podolian Uhlan Regiment (part of the Polish 3rd Carpathian Rifle Division) raised a Polish flag on ruins of the Monte Cassino abbey in Italy. On 1 August 1944, the first day of the Warsaw Uprising, a white-and-red flag was hoisted on the Prudential building, Warsaw's tallest skyscraper at the time. During the liberation of Warsaw by Soviet forces and Polish People's Army on 17 January 1945, Polish flags were raised on the Belvedere palace and ruins of the Main Railway Station. On 2 May 1945, after the capture of Berlin, soldiers of the 7th Battery, 3rd Division, 1st Light Artillery Regiment planted Polish flags on the Berlin Victory Column.

Polish flags were also used by anti-government demonstrators under the Communist rule. During the bloody riots of 1956 in Poznań and 1970 in Gdynia, protesters carried flags that were blood-stained on the white stripe.

=== Shades of red ===
Shades of red comparison
Crimson
Amaranth
Vermilion
Current statutory
HTML red

Flag of Poland (1919–1928)

Flag of Poland (1928–1980)

Flag of Poland (1980–present)

Historical flags

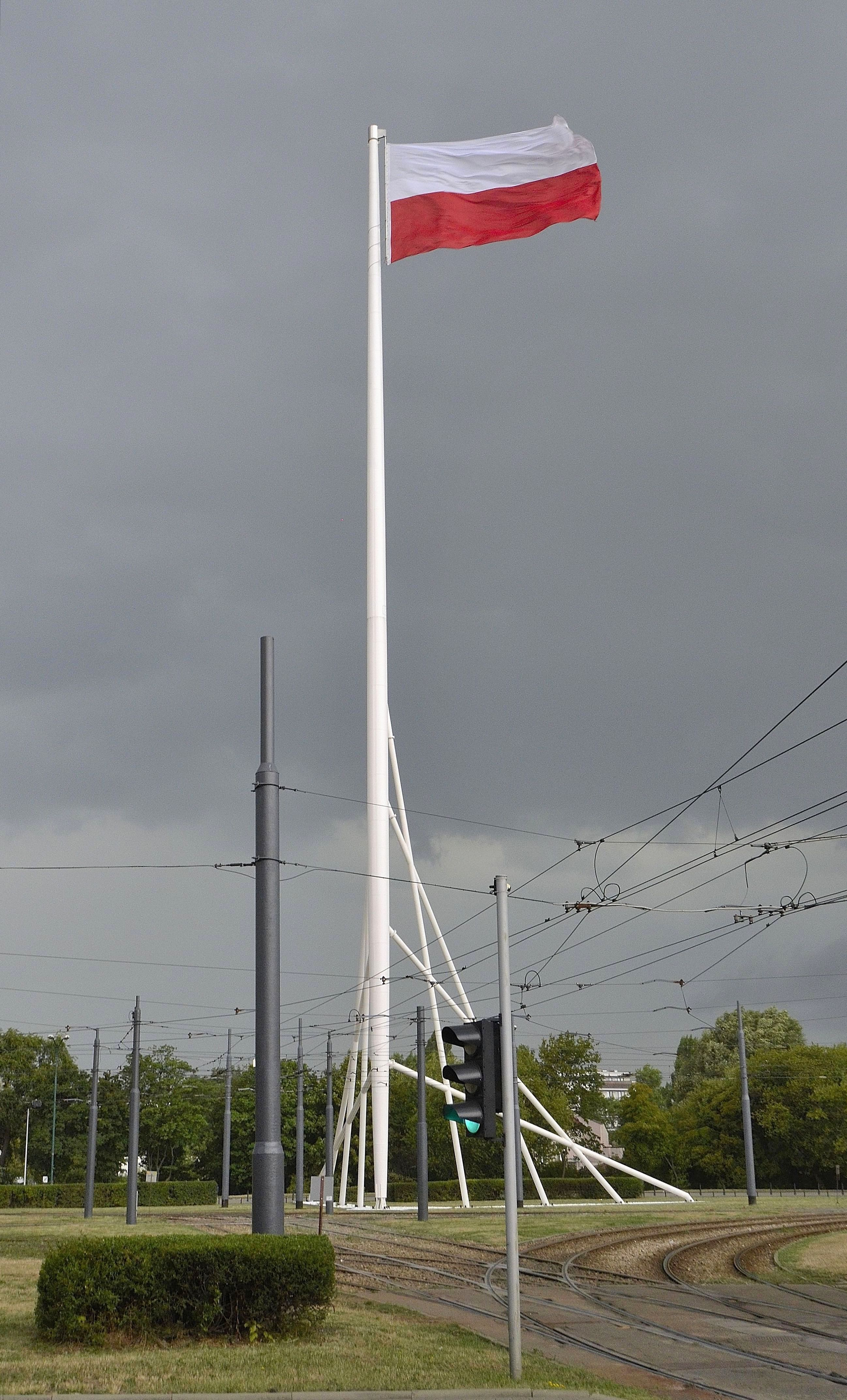
The largest Polish flag flying from the Freedom Mast in Warsaw, which, at 63 metres (207 ft), is Poland's tallest flag pole

Until 1928, the exact shades of the national colours were not legally specified. In practice, the actual hue, particularly of red, depended on what kind of red dye was available. In pre-partition Poland, crimson, due to its high price, was a colour associated with the rich and the privileged. It could be obtained from the domestically harvested Polish cochineal, although imported alternatives were also available: kermes from the Mediterranean Basin (hence karmazyn, the Polish name of the colour) and Mexican cochineal after the discovery of the New World. Crimson was reserved for the nobility and considered a symbol of the aristocracy, so that karmazyn became synonymous with a magnate. A royal ban on wearing this colour could be a form of punishment; in the 14th century, the Nałęcz clan of Greater Poland were forbidden to dress in crimson for their ancestors' complicity in the assassination of King Premislaus in 1296. In the first half of the 19th century, due to the influence of French fashion, crimson was largely replaced with the cheaper amaranth.

The National Cockade Act of 1831 did not specify the shade of red, for which it was criticised by Joachim Lelewel, nor did the Coat of Arms and National Colours Act of 1919. In 1921, the Ministry of Military Affairs issued a pamphlet with illustrations of the Polish flag and other national symbols which used the crimson shade of red. The pamphlet was not, however, an official source of law and was published for informative purpose only. The shade of red was first legally specified by a presidential decree of 13 December 1927 which stipulated that the official shade was vermilion and took effect on 29 March 1928. This specification was upheld by a decree of 7 December 1955. The Coat of Arms Act of 31 January 1980 replaced the verbal prescription with trichromatic coordinates in the CIE colour space as proposed by Nikodem Sobczak, an expert in colorimetry, bringing the resulting hue closer to crimson again.

=== Spaceflight ===
The flag of Poland has been taken to space on two occasions during crewed spaceflight. The first time was in June 1978, aboard the Soyuz 30, when Mirosław Hermaszewski (a Polish cosmonaut of the 1976 Interkosmos Group and the first Pole in space) docked with the Soviet orbital station Salyut 6 and spent over a week in orbit with a small Polish flag attached to his spacesuit. The same flag was taken back to space again almost 47 years later, in June 2025, when ESA astronaut Sławosz Uznański-Wiśniewski became the second Polish national to reach orbital flight. One of the items Uznański-Wiśniewski took with him aboard the Crew Dragon Grace that carried Axiom Mission 4 to the International Space Station was the same flag from Hermaszewski's spacesuit. This also marked Poland's first mission to the ISS and the first time that the Polish flag appeared on that space station.

== Related and similar flags ==
Polish naval ensign

Polish naval airbase flag

Flag of Lower Silesia (2001–2008)

Flag of Lesser Poland

Examples of related flags

The flag of the Grand Duchy of Posen, a Polish-populated autonomous province of the Kingdom of Prussia created in 1815, was a red-and-white horizontal bicolour. Its colours were taken from the duchy's coat of arms which consisted of the Prussian Black Eagle with an inescutcheon of the Polish White Eagle. With Germany's increasingly anti-Polish policy and a rising identification of white and red as Polish national colours, the red-and-white flag of Posen was replaced in 1886 with a white-black-white horizontal triband.

Today, many flags used in Poland are based on the design of the national flag. This applies especially to flags defined by Polish law and used by the Polish military and other uniformed services, such as the naval ensign – a swallow-tailed horizontal bicolour of white and red defaced with the arms of Poland in the white stripe. Flags of some administrative subdivisions also resemble the national flag. Examples include the former flag of the Lower Silesian Voivodeship – a horizontal bicolour of white and red defaced with the arms of the voivodeship – or the flag of the Lesser Poland Voivodeship – a horizontal tricolour of white, yellow and red with the yellow stripe half as wide as any of the other two.

== See also ==
- List of Polish flags
- List of Polish naval and maritime flags
- Flag of Indonesia, same colors and size but inverted
- Flag of Thuringia, same colors but different size
- Countryballs, originated with the Polish flag
