= Chrzanów, Warsaw =

Neighbourhood of Warsaw, Poland

Chrzanów
- City Information System area (neighbourhood)
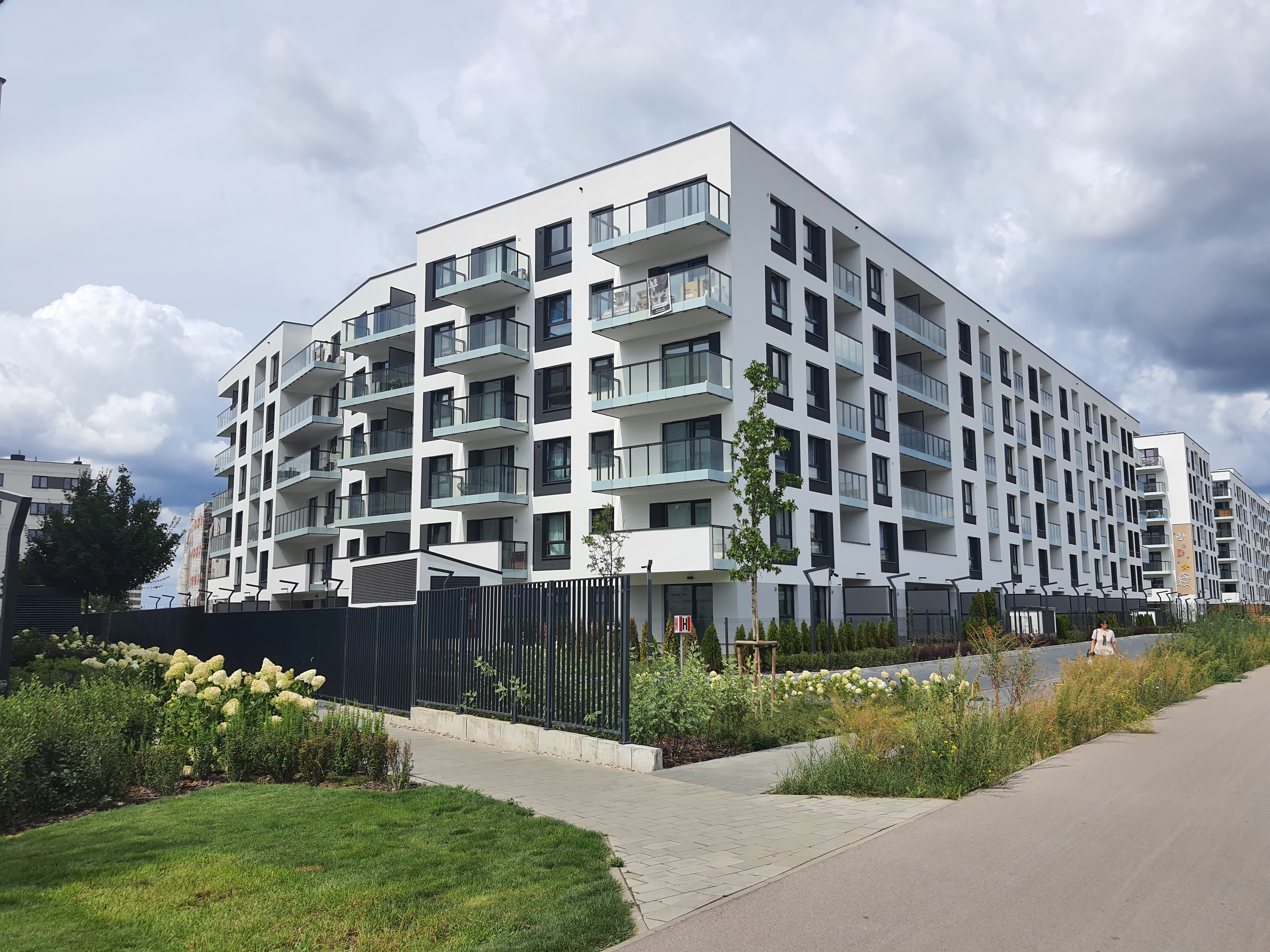
- An apartment building on Lazurowa Street in Chrzanów.

- Location of the City Information System area of Chrzanów within the district of Bemowo.
- Coordinates: 52°13′24.17″N 20°53′07.64″E
- Country: Poland
- Voivodeship: Masovian
- City county: Warsaw
- District: Bemowo
- Time zone: UTC+1 (CET)
  - Summer (DST): UTC+2 (CEST)
- Area code: +48 22

Chrzanów (Polish: [ˈxʂan.uf]) is a neighbourhood, and the City Information System area, in the city of Warsaw, Poland, located within the district of Bemowo. It is a residential neighbourhood dominated by mid-rise multifamily housing.

Chrzanów was founded in the 15th century as a small farming community. It was incorporated into Warsaw in 1951. Currently, within its boundaries are being constructed two metro stations, Chrzanów, and Karolin, which are planned to be opened in 2026.

== History ==
Chrzanów was founded in the 15th century as a small farming community located near Poznań Road (now Połczyńska Street). It was an extension of the village of Macierzysz. In 1512, the name of the settlement was listed as Macierzysz Mały (lit. Little Macierzysz; in contemporary orthography: Manczyrzysch Maly), in 1521, as Chrzanów inaczej w Mniejszym Macierzyszu (lit. Chrzanów also known as Smaller Macierzysz; in contemporary orthography: Chrzanow ynaczey w m[n]yeyschem Mączyrzyschu), and since 1526, listed as Chrzanowo, and later also as Macierzysz-Chrzanowo. Since the 19th century, the village was known as Chrzanów.

In 1827, Chrzanów had 84 inhabitants and included 17 houses. It was part of the municipality of Blizne. Around 1877, fifteen German settlers founded a small settlement of Nowy Chrzanów (lit. New Chrzanów), located along the current Okrętowa Street. By the 19th century, in the area was also present the village of Karolin, located to the north of the current Połczyńska Street. In 1921, it had 157 inhabitants.

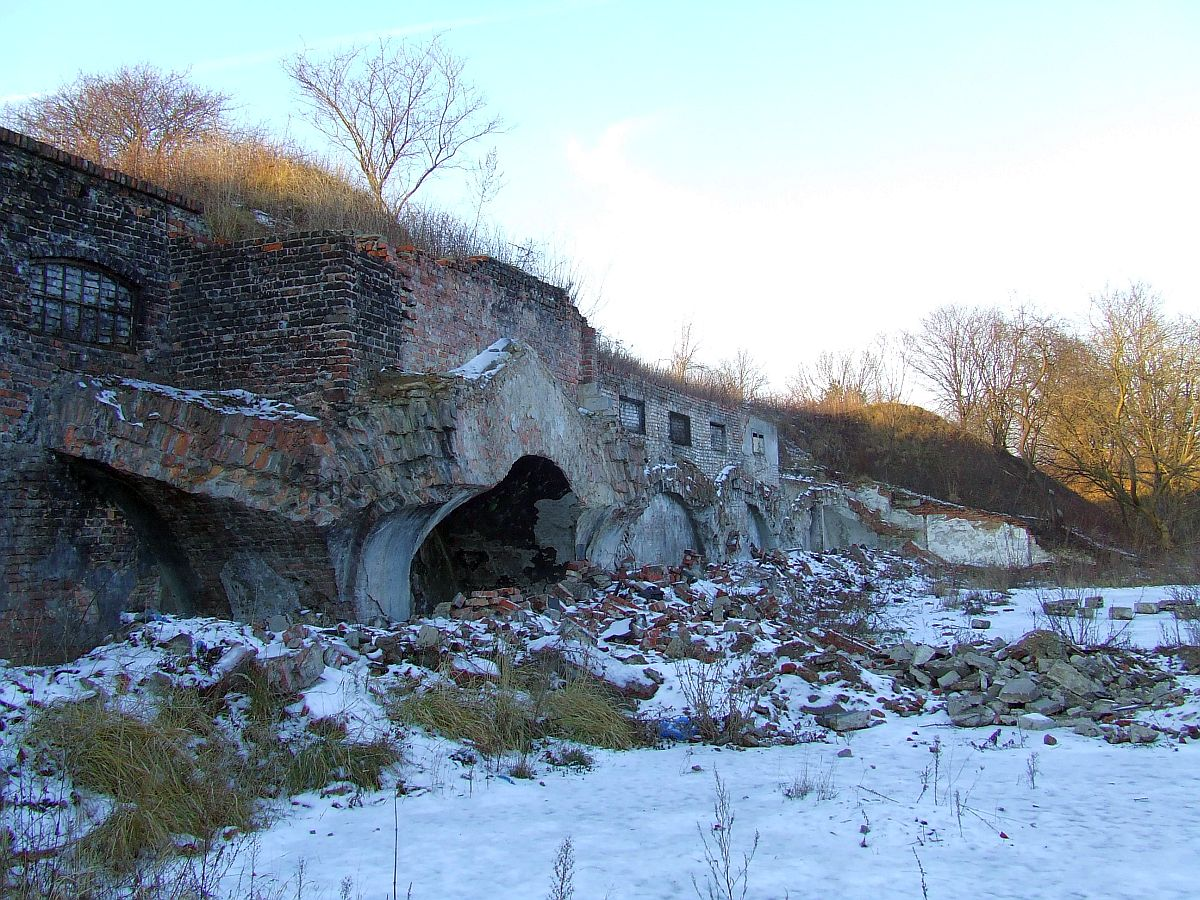
The ruins of the Fort IV in Chrzanów, in 2008.

Between 1883 and 1890, the Fort IV was constructed near Chrzanów, as part of the series of fortifications of the Warsaw Fortress, built around Warsaw by the Russian Imperial Army. It was decommissioned in 1909 and partially demolished in 1913, and was repurposed as a warehouse. Currently, the building remains as ruins.

In 1929, an experimental agricultural research facility, and a gardening school with an arboretum, operated by the Warsaw Garden Association, were opened near the settlement of Mory, in the modern area of Chrzanów.

In the September 1939, during the siege of Warsaw during the Second World War, the 360th Infantry Regiment of the Polish Armed Forces had defended its position in the fort against the invading German forces. The area was eventually captured. Nowy Chrzanów had been recaptured on 18 September 1939, in the offensive by the group of Polish Armed Forces soldiers under the command of Leopold Okulicki. It remained under Polish control until the capitulation of Warsaw, on 28 September 1939.

On 14 May 1951, the area was incorporated into Warsaw, becoming part of the Wola district. On 29 December 1989, following an administrative reform in the city, it became part of the municipality of Warsaw-Wola, and on 25 March 1994, of the municipality of Warsaw-Bemowo, which, on 27 October 2002, was restructured into the city district of Bemowo. In 1997, it was subdivided into ten areas of the City Information System, with Chrzanów becoming one of them.

In 1953, the Institute of Energetics was opened near Mory, within the modern boundaries of Chrzanów, as a research centre on the energy transfer.

Before 2005, Chrzanów had mostly rural characteristics with low-rise family houses, and farmlands. Beginning in 2006, the area began attracting new investments with the construction of large residential estates with apartment buildings.

Between 2008 and 2011, a fragment of the Expressway S8, in form of Obrońców Grodna Avenue, was built crossing the neighbourhood.

In 2022, the construction of two metro stations of the M2 line of the Warsaw Metro underground rapid transit system begun in Chrzanów. This includes Chrzanów at the corner of Szeligowskiej and Rayskiego Streets, and Karolin at the corner of Sochaczewska and Połczyńska Streets. Both stations are planned to be opened in 2026.

== Characteristics ==
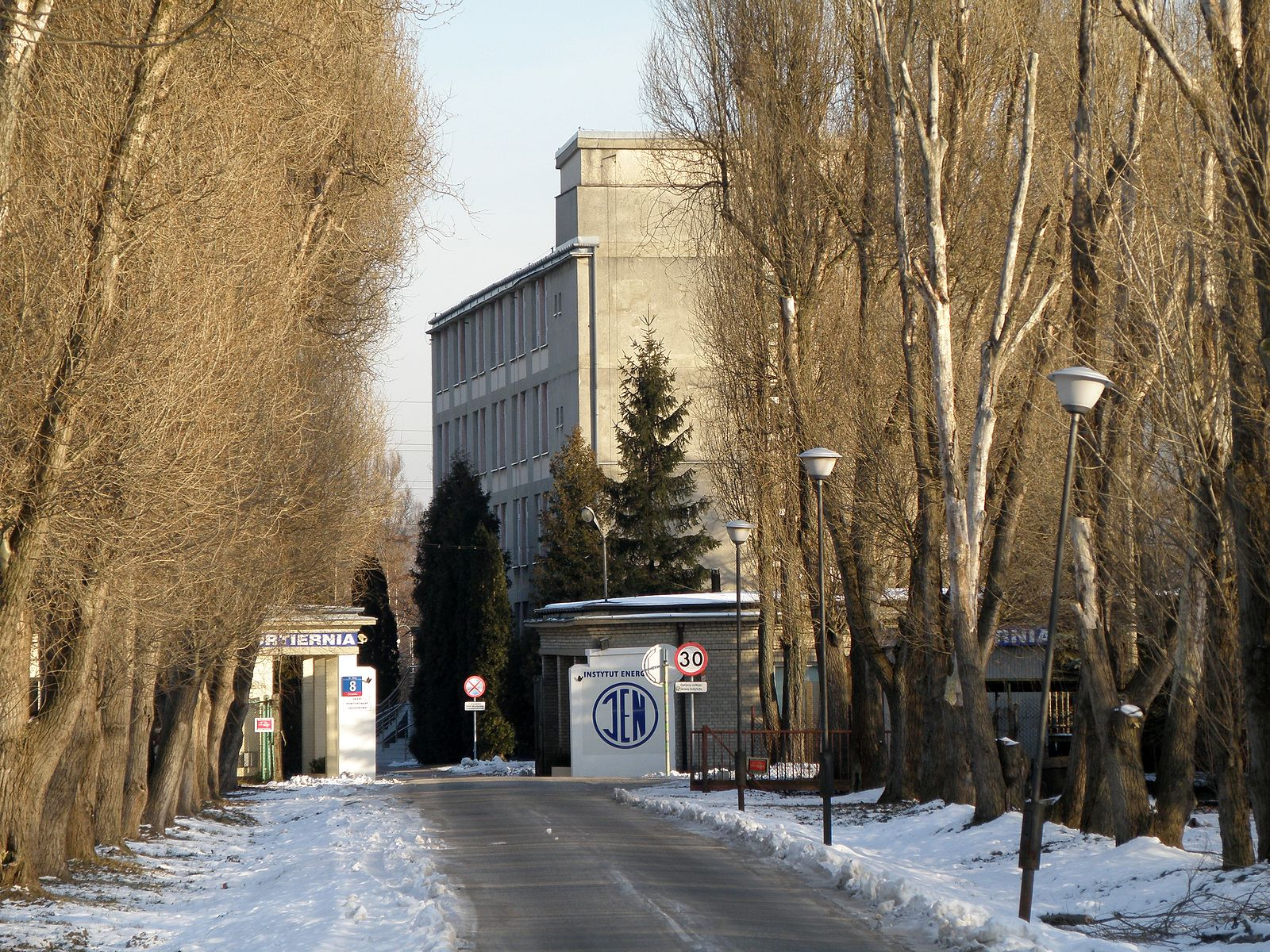
The Institute of Energetic.

Chrzanów is a residential area, dominated by mid-rise housing estates with apartment buildings. It also includes a low-rise single-family housing neighbourhood of Na Wyraju in the central east, at the corner of Na Wyraju and Sochaczewska Streets, as well as the warehouse district of Karolin in the south along Połczyńska Street.

Chrzanów also includes the ruins of the Fort IV, historic decommissioned fortifications dating to the 1890s. It is placed at the corner of Lazurowa and Połczyńska Streets, and is surrounded by apartment buildings. The neighbourhood also includes the headquarters of the Institute of Energetics, national research centre of the energy transfer, located 8 Mory Street.

The neighbourhood is also crossed by the expressway S8 to the east. Currently, within its boundaries are being built two metro stations of the M2 line of the Warsaw Metro underground rapid transit system, including Chrzanów at the corner of Szeligowskiej and Rayskiego Streets, and Karolin at the intersection of Sochaczewska and Połczyńska Streets. Both stations are planned to be opened in 2026.

== Boundaries ==
Chrzanów is a City Information System area, located in the southwestern of the district of Bemowo. Its boundaries are approximately determined by Górczewska Street to the north; Lazurowa Street, and Szligowska Street to the east, around the tracks of the railway line no. 3 to the south; and around the city boundary to the west, including partially along Batalionów Chłopskich Street, and Świętego Mikołaja Street. It borders Górce to the north, Jelonki Północne, and Jelonki Południowe to the east, Gołąbki, Nowe Włochy, and Szamoty, to the south, and municipalities of Stare Babice, and Ożarów Mazowiecki, with villages of Blizne Łaszczyńskiego, Macierzysz, Mory, and Szeligi. Its western boundary forms the city border with the Warsaw West County. To the south it also borders districts of Włochy and Ursus.
