= Szczepan Paśnik =

Executed Polish serial killer

- Paśnik in 1922
- Born: 1887; Aleksandrów, Masovian Voivodeship, Russian Empire
- Died: 7 April 1922 (aged 34–35); Warsaw Citadel, Warsaw, Masovian Voivodeship, Poland
- Cause of death: Execution by firing squad
- Other names: "The Polish Landru" "The Landru of the Vistula"; Szczepan Banach; Władysław Witkowski; Bronisław Witkowski; Franciszek Balas
- Conviction: Murder
- Penalty: 12 years of penal labor (1910s); Death (1922)

Details
- Victims: 8+
- Span of crimes: 1900s–1922
- Country: Russian Empire, Poland
- States: Saint Petersburg, Masovia
- Date apprehended: 24 February 1922

Szczepan Paśnik (1887 – 7 April 1922), known as The Polish Landru (Polish: Polski Landru), was a Polish serial killer who, together with his wife Józefa Paśnik (née Talarek; 1882 – 7 April 1922), raped and murdered at least seven women around the Warsaw region in the early months of 1922. Prior to these crimes, Paśnik escaped from serving a 12-year prison sentence in the Russian Empire for murdering a guard.

After being convicted of their crimes and their appeals were rejected, the couple were jointly executed for their crimes in April 1922. Józefa became the last woman to be executed for a non-military offense in the history of Poland.

== Early life and crimes ==
Szczepan Paśnik was born in 1887 in the village of Aleksandrów, in the Masovian Voivodeship, the only son of Krzysztof Paśnik. Little is known about his early life, but around 1907, he married Józefa Talarek, who was a couple of years older than him.

Sometime around the early 1900s, Paśnik was arrested on a theft charge in Saint Petersburg. While being escorted to prison, he murdered one of the guards, which earned him a 12-year sentence at a gulag in Siberia. However, after serving 7 years of said sentence, he managed to escape after the outbreak of the Russian Revolution. In early 1919, he returned to Poland, and made a living out of robbing people.

For a brief period of time, he abandoned his wife for a new lover, Józefa Gendek, who allegedly encouraged him to continue his criminal activities. Over the next few years, Paśnik was repeatedly imprisoned and left destitute, leading him to develop a resentment towards Gendek, whom he blamed for his problems.

== Murders ==
In early January 1922, Paśnik committed his first known murder in Parzniew after he stabbed Józefa Gendek to death with a penknife. He then stripped her of her clothing, and sold them in Warsaw. Fearing that her mother, Maria Wiśniewska, would expose him for this crime, he would kill her a few days later after he lured her to the Helenowski grove outside of Pruszków.

Shortly after these killings, he reunited with his wife, and the pair started killing together. The couple's modus operandi consisted of Józefa seeking out poor female migrant workers at the Warsaw Main Station and introducing them to her husband. Szczepan would come up with various ruses in order to lure the victims to an isolated area, where he would often rape, murder, and rob them. The killings were usually carried out with a blunt instrument or via slitting the victim's throat, and the corpses were often dismembered post-mortem. Józefa would later sell the victim's clothes at Kercelego Square.

Following his arrest, Szczepan would confess to killing at least five additional women throughout the month of February. The first known victim is Rozalia Garlicką, a cousin of Gendek's who was beaten to death with an iron bar near Duchnice. A few days later, Szczepan lured a female visitor from Kalisz to Włochy, where he slit her throat with a razor. When asked, he was unable to recall her name, as he claimed to "have had so many lovers" that he never bothered remembering what they were called.

In mid-February, Szczepan murdered another woman between Miłosna and Wawer, but the only details he was able to recall was that her name was "Stasia" and that she originated from Płońsk. Shortly afterwards, he murdered another woman, Maria Justyniak, whose body was found near the village of Teresin.

On 20 February, Józefa was at the station when she came across Michalina Matwiejawa and Maria Moroz, two Rusyn emigrants who were looking for work so they could move to Canada. Józefa offered to meet them on the following day, and once they did, she introduced them to Szczepan, who presented himself as a wealthy farmer who had recently returned from the USA and owned a farm in Ożarów. After having a dinner with the two women, they "hired" Moroz, while Matwiejawa returned to the station to look for work.

On that same evening, Szczepan took the train with Moroz to Płochocin, from where they traveled on foot along the tracks to Błonie. He then threatened her into having sex with him, after which he strangled her with a belt. He then robbed her of all her valuables, and gave Moroz's scarf to Józefa. The victim's body was found four days later by the son of a railway official.

== Arrest, trial, and execution ==
Due to the fact that some of the victims were seen accompanying the same man, officers decided to track him down for questioning. On the initiative of Detective Józef Sikorski and police intelligence officer Antoni Bednarek, they started tailing Szczepan, and once they were convinced that he was their person of interest, they detained him. When detained, Szczepan presented himself as "Bronisław Witkowski" from Kielce and Józefa as "Agnieszka Karasińska", but when he was searched, the officers found documents in the name of "Franciszek Balas".

During his interrogation, Szczepan immediately admitted to all of the recent murders, implicating his wife as an accomplice. When asked what prompted him to do this, he replied that he derived pleasure from tormenting the women and butchering their corpses. Józefa at first tried to feign ignorance, but eventually relented and admitted to being actively involved in the crimes.

At one point, Szczepan confessed to murdering two Jewish women prior to his 1922 murder spree, but these alleged victims were never found.

Not long after their arrest, both of them were charged with several counts of murder and tried before the Warsaw Court. Due to the nature of the crimes, Szczepan was frequently compared to French serial killer Henri Désiré Landru. A notable figure at the trial was Dr. Wiktor Grzywo-Dąbrowski, a pioneer of Polish forensic science, who served as the Chief Medical Examiner.

In an attempt to save his client's life, Szczepan's attorney, N. Goldszjtein, attempted to discredit witness testimony. He then tried to convince the court that Szczepan was insane, pointing out that he had spent time at the psychiatric hospital in Tworki for a prolonged period of time. These arguments were rejected by Judge Jan Gumiński, who stated that there was no present doubt about the accused's mental state.

Due to the overwhelming amount of evidence against them, Szczepan and Józefa were found guilty and promptly sentenced to death. Upon hearing the verdict, Szczepan simply smiled and exhibited an odd grimace on his face, while Józefa began crying and pleading for mercy. Szczepan then calmed her down, and eventually convinced her to also smile.

On the following morning, at 6:35 AM, Szczepan and Józefa Paśnik were executed via firing squad at the Warsaw Citadel. A newspaper reported that the only notable moments from the event was the couple kissing the cross, and that they remained calm throughout the ordeal.

== See also ==
- List of serial killers by country
