= Jelonki Północne =

Neighbourhood in Warsaw, Poland

- City Information System area (neighbourhood)
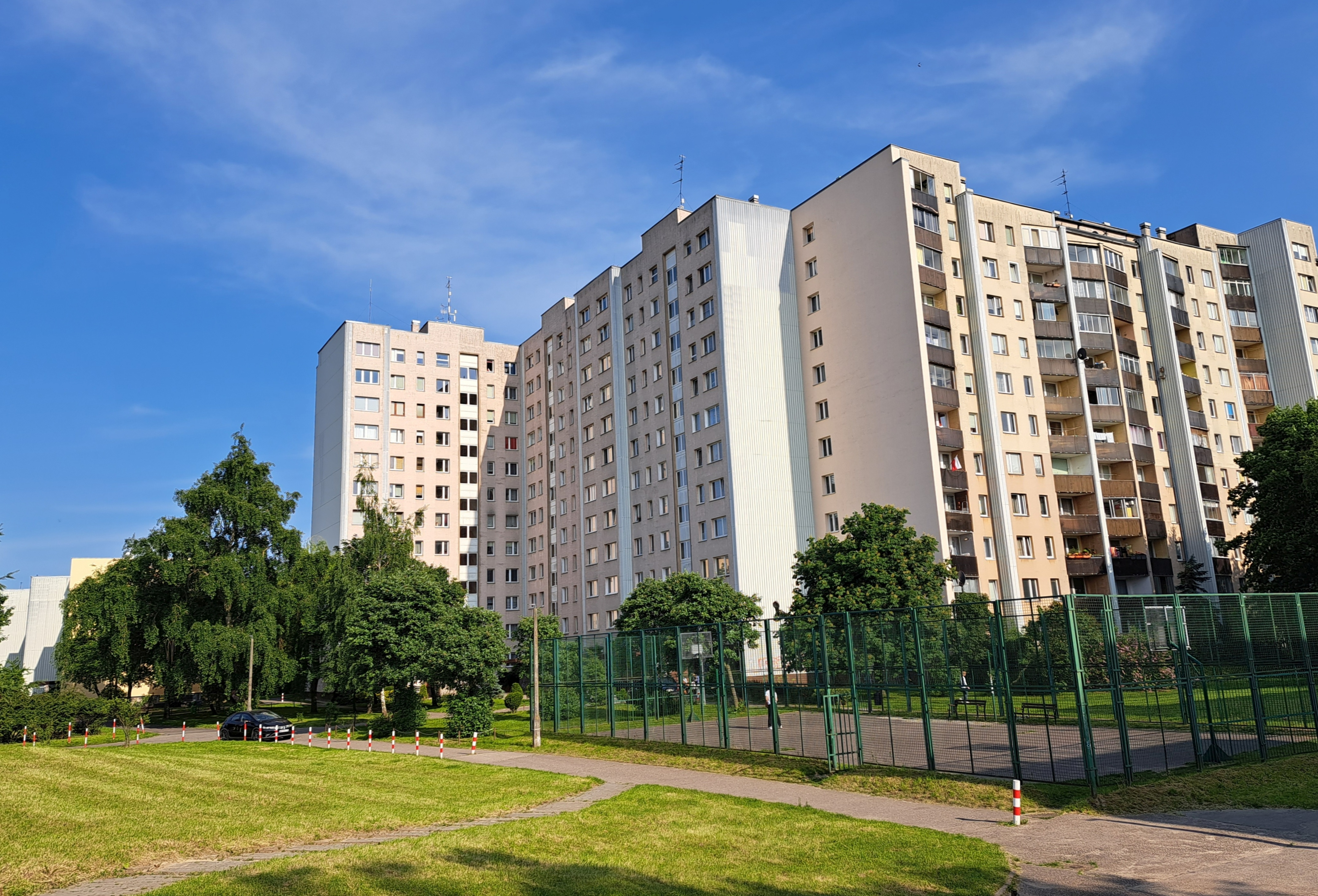
- Apartment buildings at Doroszewskiego Street.
- Interactive map of Jelonki Północne
- Coordinates: 52.233820°N 20.909981°E
- Country: Poland
- Voivodeship: Masovian
- City county: Warsaw
- District: Bemowo
- Time zone: UTC+1 (CET)
  - Summer (DST): UTC+2 (CEST)
- Area code: +48 22

Jelonki Północne (Polish: [jɛ.lɔŋˈki puwˈnɔt͡s.nɛ]; lit. 'North Jelonki') is a neighbourhood, and a City Information System area, in the Bemowo district of Warsaw, Poland. It is a mixed residential area with low-rise single-family neighbourhoods of Stare Jelonki and Friendship Estate, and the high-rise multifamily housing estate of Górczewska. It includes the Górczewska Park, and features two stations of the Warsaw Metro, Bemowo and Lazurowa, as well as the Warszawa Jelonki railway station. It forms a northern portion of the area of Jelonki.

Jelonki was founded in the 19th century at a small farming community. In the 1920s, its land was partitioned, and the village was developed as a garden suburb. It was incorporated into Warsaw in 1951. In 1952, the Frienship Estate, a neighbourhood of wooden houses, was built within its current boundaries, originally providing accommodation for Soviet migrant labourers, and after 1955, for university students and teachers. In the 1970s and 1980s, the housing estate of Górczewska with mid- and high-rise apartment buildings was constructed, within its boundaries.

== Toponomy ==
The name Jelonki is a Polish plural diminutive form of the term meaning cervus, a genus of deer which was present in the area. Historically, before 1951, the neighbourhood was also known as Jelonek, a singular diminutive form. Północne in its name translates to north, referring to it being the northern portion of the area of Jelonki.

== History ==
=== Founding and development ===
A small farming community, later known as Jelonki, was established in the area in the 19th century, next to the village of Odolany, to the north of the Poznań Road (now Połczyńska Street). The village was bought by Bogumił Schneider, a businessman, who moved to the area from Westphalia. In the second half of the century, he built his residence in the form of a brick manor house, near the current Fortuny Street. In 1904, the village had 729 inhabitants and included 19 houses and a school. After the purchase, the village began being known as Jelonki and Jelonek. In 1846, the Bogumił Schneider Brickworks and Roof Tiles Factory (Polish: Zakłady Cegielniane i Fabryka Dachówek „Bogumił Schneider”), in the area, which produced bricks, roof tiles, and ceramics. The factory had a good reputation, being locally known for the good quality of its products. Many houses and tenements in Warsaw were built from its bricks.

In 1927, inspired by the garden city movement, the Schneider family divided and sold a portion of their land, promoting the construction of villas and gardens in the village. They also founded a garden and a fruit tree orchard, located around their summer residence, and also drew plans of wide town streets, including Schneider Avenue, which currently forms Powstańców Śląskich Street. In 1932, the settlement had been renamed to Miasto-Ogród Jelonek (Garden Town of Jelonek). A marketplace, known as the John III Sobieski Square, now known as the Castellan Square, was also built there.

=== Second World War ===
Jelonki was captured by German forces in early September 1939 during the siege of Warsaw in the Second World War. On 18 September 1939, they were recaptured in a counter-offensive by the 360th Infantry Regiment of the Polish Armed Forces, commanded by lieutenant colonel Leopold Okulicki. Their forces included four infantry companies, with heavy machine gun platoons, and one mortar platoon. They were also supported by a artillery batteries, a platoon of 7TP light tanks, as well as a company of the Capital Battalion, with the latter being pushed back during the attacks. The motorized platoon suffered heavy loses in an encounter against German Panzer 35(t) light tanks. The village was recaptured with severe losses suffered by the Polish infantry, and remained under Polish control until the capitulation of Warsaw on 28 September 1939.

In 1943, Jelonki had 3,826 inhabitants.

=== Expansion as a suburb ===
Since 1867, the area was part of the municipality of Blizne. On 25 March 1938, a village assembly (Polish: gromada) of Jelonki, with the seat in Miasto Ogród Jelonek, was founded as a subdivision of the municipality. After the war, the village also became the seat of the municipal government. In 1947, the village was connected with Warsaw, via the bus route W, between the Wola tram depot and the Castellan Square.

In 1943, the Schneiders family donated 28 hectares of their land to the municipality, for the symbolic price of 1 złoty, for the development of streets, churches, schools, preschools, a town hall, and other objects. After the war, Miasto Ogród Jelonek became the seat of the municipal government. In 1947, the village was connected with Warsaw, via the bus route W, between the Wola tram depot at Młynarska Street and the Castellan Square. On 14 May 1951, the area was incorporated into the city of Warsaw, becoming part of the Wola district. On 29 December 1989, following an administrative reform in the city, it became part of the municipality of Warsaw-Wola, and on 25 March 1994, of the municipality of Warsaw-Bemowo, which, on 27 October 2002, was restructured into the city district of Bemowo. In 1997, it was subdivided into ten areas, with Północne Jelonki becoming one of them.

In 1952, the Warszawa Jelonki railway station was established near the corner of Strąkowska and Wincentego Pola Streets.

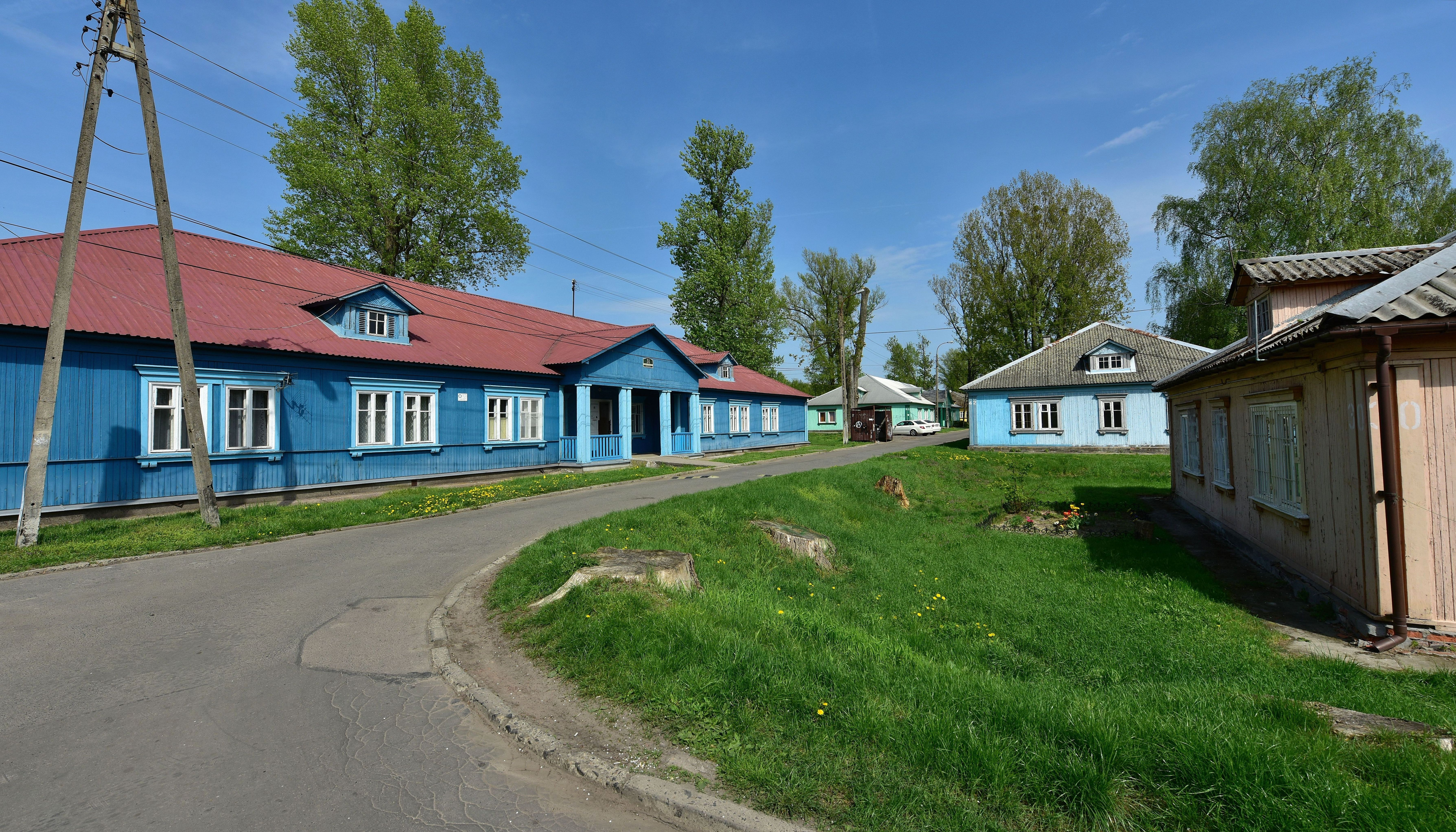
The wooden houses of the Friendship Estate, dating to 1952.

In 1952, the Friendship Estate was developed to the north of Jelonki. It provided housing for several thousand labourers from the Soviet Union, employed at the construction of the Palace of Culture and Science. The government acquired the land from the owners via the compulsory purchase. Two types of wooden buildings were built in the neighbourhood; pavilions with suites for labourers and single-family detached houses for technicians. They were shipped in prefabricated pieces to the city, and assembled on site. According to some sources, a portion of the buildings were shipped from the prisoner-of-war camp Stalag I-B near Olsztynek, Poland. The neighbourhood also included a cinema, a student club, a bathhouse, a medical clinic, a boiler room, and two pitches. In 1952, it was connected to a sewage network, with the construction of the nearby pumping station. At its peak, the neighbourhood had 4,500 inhabitants. Numerous festivals, Polish and Soviet youth meetings, and sports competitions were hosted there. After the end of the construction of the Palace of Culture and Science in 1955, the neighbourhood was given by the city to the Ministry of Higher Education, which designated it for student housing for the universities in the city. In September 1955, it was inhabited by 3,000 students, as well as teaching assistants. It was connected with the rest of the city via two bus lines. It also began hosting an annual student festival.

In 1958, association football club Robotniczy Klub Sportowy Świt merged with club Ludowy Klub Sportowy Lech Jelonki, which played on the pitch at Połczyńska Street. In 1960, the club again merged with Dąb Jelonki, taking over its pitch at 12 Oświatowa Street. In the following years, it was acquired by the Warsaw Gasworks, with most of the players being its employees, and renamed to Gazowniczy Klub Sportowy Świt Warszawa. Later, it became a property of PGNiG.

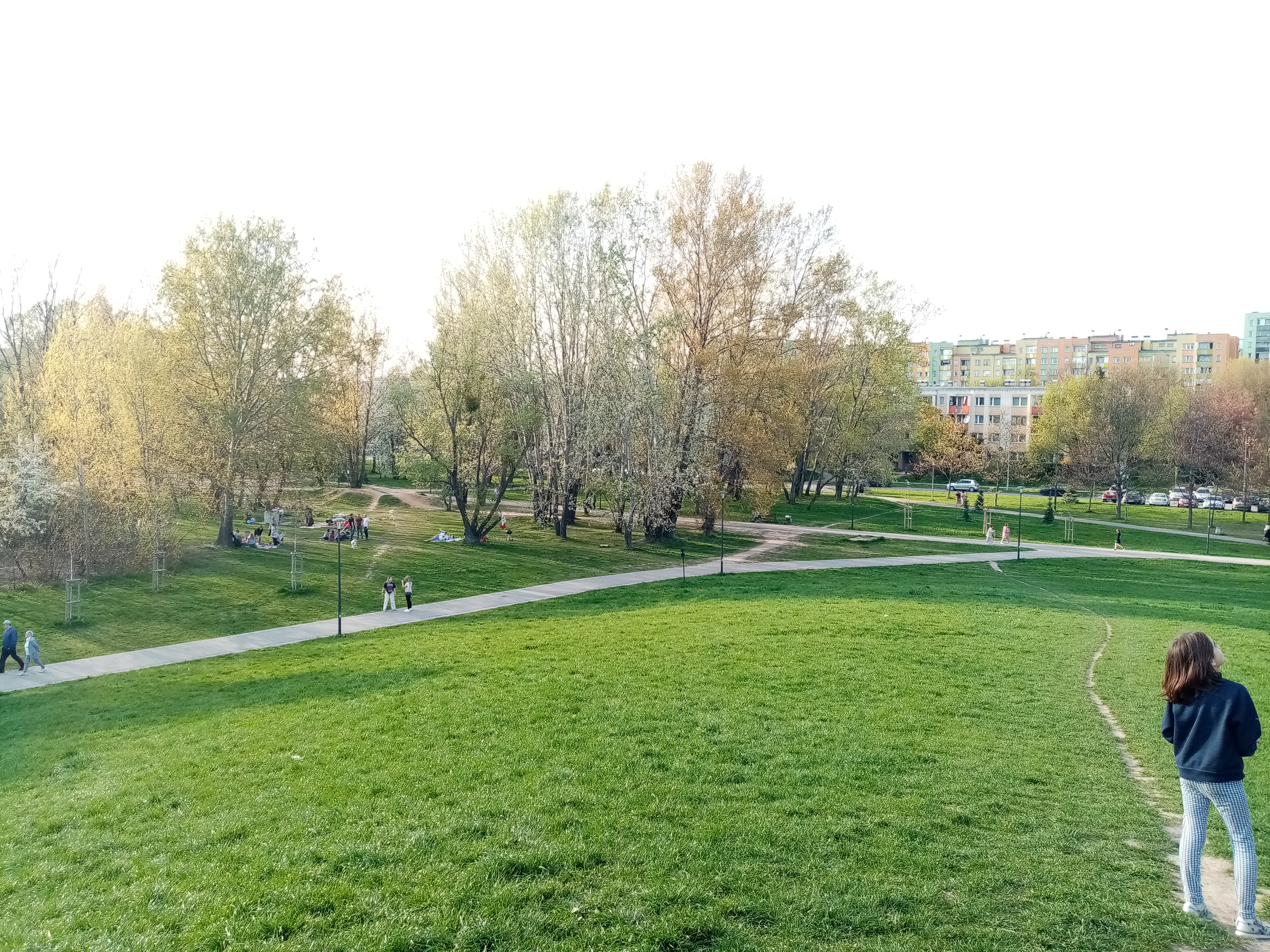
The Górczewska Park, developed in 1980.

Between 1974 and 1981, the housing estate of Górczewska was developed to the northwest of the historical low-rise houses of Jelonki. It consisted of mid- and high-rise apartment buildings, constructed in the large panel system technique. Additionally, the Górczewska Park was developed in 1980 around its buildings. In 2008 an amphitheatre was opened.

In 1992, tram line tracks were constructed alongside Górczewska and Powstańców Śląskich Streets. In 1995, the Church of Mary the Mother of God, belonging to the Catholic denomination, was built was at 13 Muszlowa Street.

In 2000, the Bemowo Civic Centre, which houses the district government, was opened at 70 Powstańców Śląskich Street.

In 2006, the Bemowo Cultural Centre was opened at 18 Rozłogi Street.

In 2022, the Bemowo station of the M2 line of the Warsaw Metro rapid transit underground system, was opened at the intersection of Górczewska and Powstańców Śląskich Streets. Since 2022, the Lazurowa station is also being constructed in the neighbourhood at the intersection of Górczewska and Lazurowa Streets. It is planned to be opened in 2026.

== Overview ==
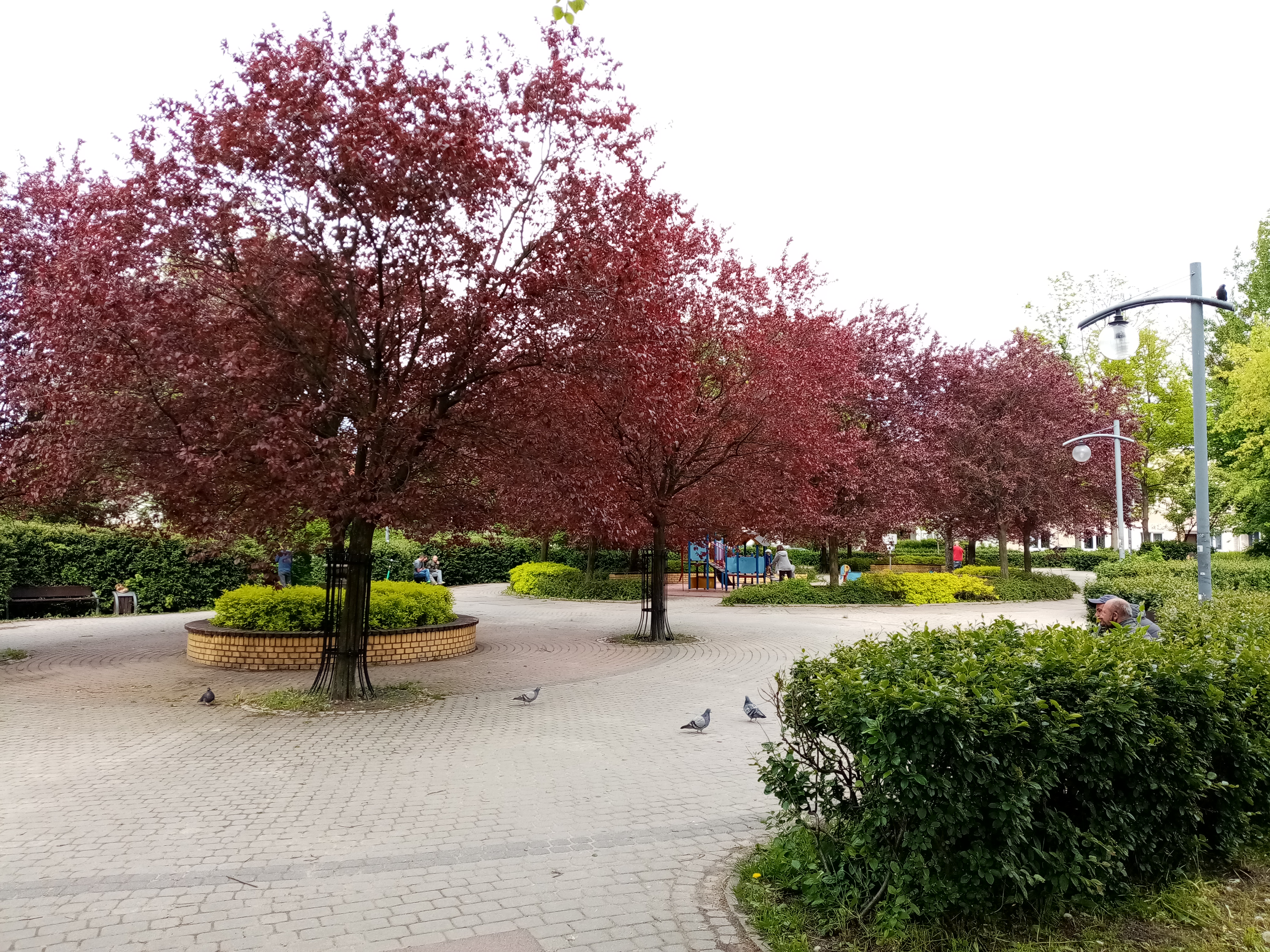
The Castellan Square.

Jelonki Północne consists of three housing estates. To the east of Powstańców Śląskich Street, it has Górczewska, consisting of mid and high-rise apartment buildings. Its centre features the Górczewska Park, which includes an amphitheatre, and had an area of 20.47 ha. To the east, it includes a portion of the neighbourhood of Stare Jelonki with low-rise single-family detached and semi-detached houses and small tenements. It partially extentends into the Wola district to the east. It includes the Castellan Square at the corner of Powstańców Śląskich and Strąkowska Streets. To the north, beyond Olbrachta Street, is also located the Friendship Estate, consisting of historic wooden houses, dating to 1952, which are used as student dormitories. It also has the Bemowo Civic Centre at 70 Powstańców Śląskich Street.

Jelonki Północne includes the Bemowo station of the M2 line of the Warsaw Metro rapid transit underground system, at the intersection of Górczewska and Powstańców Śląskich Street. Currently, at the intersection of Górczewska and Lazurowa Street, the Lazurowa station is also being built, with plans to open in 2026. It also has the Warszawa Jelonki railway station, near the corner of Strąkowska and Wincentego Pola Streets. The neighbourhood also includes the tracks of the tram line network, alongside Górczewska, and Powstańców Śląskich Streets.

The neighbourhood also has the Bemowo Cultural Centre at 18 Rozłogi Street, and features the annual student festival of Jelonkalia, hosted in the Friendship Estate. The area includes the homefield of the association football club Gazowniczy Klub Sportowy Świt Warszawa, placed at 12 Oświatowa Street, and with 140 seats. The Church of Mary the Mother of God, at 13 Muszlowa Street, which belongs to the Catholic denomination, is also present within its boundaries.

== Boundaries ==
Jelonki Południowe is a City Information System area located in Warsaw, Poland, within the central portion of the district of Bemowo. Its boundaries are approximately determined by Górczewska Street to the north; railway line no. 509 to the dast; Czułchowska Street to the south; and Lazurowa Street to the west. It borders Górce to the north, Koło to the northeast, Ulrychów to the east, Jelonki Południowe to the south, and Chrzanów to the west.
