= Karolin, Warsaw =

Neighbourhood in Warsaw, Poland

Karolin
- Neighbourhood
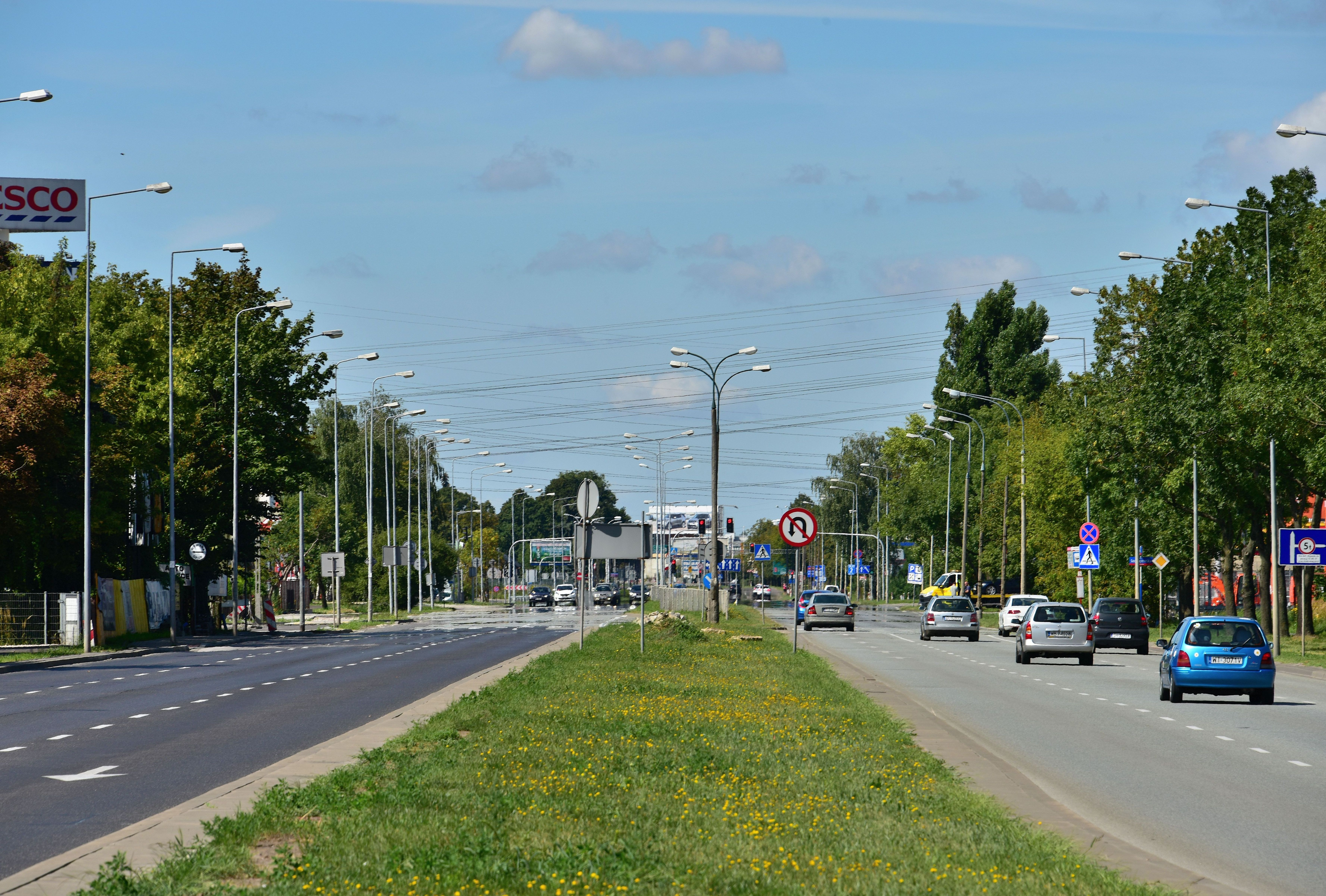
- Połczyńska Street, near the intersection with Sochaczewska Street, in 2018.
- Interactive map of Karolin
- Coordinates: 52°12′56″N 20°53′11″E
- Country: Poland
- Voivodeship: Masovian
- City and county: Warsaw
- District: Bemowo
- City Information System area: Chrzanów
- Incorporation into Warsaw: 14 May 1951
- Time zone: UTC+1 (CET)
  - Summer (DST): UTC+2 (CEST)
- Area code: +48 22

Karolin (Polish: [kaˈrɔ.lin]) is a neighbourhood and a warehouse district, in Warsaw, Poland, within the Bemowo district. It is located within the City Information System area of Chrzanów, in the area of Połczyńska Street, near the intersection with Dostawcza Street. Currently, the Karolin metro station is being constructed in the neighbourhood, with plans to open in 2026.

== History ==
By the 19th century, Karolin was a small farming community located near the Poznań Road (now Połczyńska Street). Since 1867, it has belonged to the municipality of Skorcze. In 1921, it had 157 inhabitants, and in 1943, 277 inhabitants. In the second half of the 19th-, and first half of the 20th-century, it was inhabited by an impoverish population.

On 14 May 1951, it was incorporated into Warsaw, becoming part of the Wola district. On 29 December 1989, following an administrative reform in the city, it became part of the municipality of Warsaw-Wola, and on 25 March 1994, of the municipality of Warsaw-Bemowo, which, on 27 October 2002, was restructured into the city district of Bemowo. In 1997, the neighbourhood became part of the City Information System of Chrzanów.

In 2022, the construction Karolin metro station, began at the corner of Sochaczewska and Połczyńska Streets. It is part of the M2 line of the Warsaw Metro underground rapid transit system. The station is planned to be opened in 2026.

== Overview ==
Karolin is a warehouse district located alongside Połczyńska Street, near the intersection with Dostawcza Street. Currently, within its boundaries is being built the Karolin metro station, as part of the M2 line of the Warsaw Metro underground rapid transit system, located at the intersection of Sochaczewska and Połczyńska Streets.
