= Górczewska =

Neighbourhood in Warsaw, Poland

- Neighbourhood
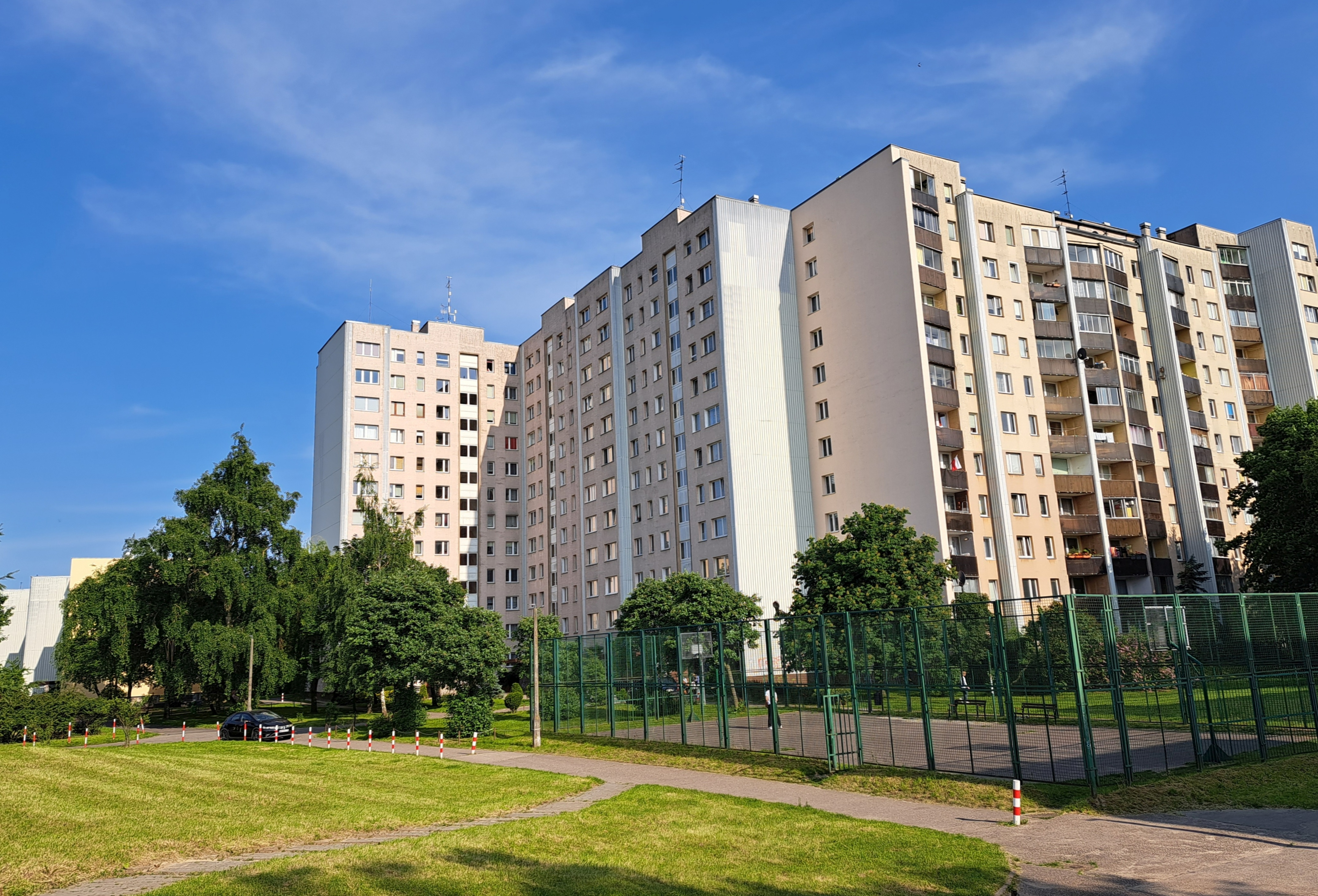
- Apartment buildings at Doroszewskiego Street
- Interactive map of Górczewska
- Coordinates: 52.233512°N 20.905260°E
- Country: Poland
- Voivodeship: Masovian
- City county: Warsaw
- District: Bemowo
- City Information System area: Jelonki Północne
- Established: 1981

Area
  - Total: 1.17 km^{2} (0.45 sq mi)
- Time zone: UTC+1 (CET)
  - Summer (DST): UTC+2 (CEST)
- Area code: +48 22

Górczewska (Polish: [ɡur.ˈt͡ʂɛv.ska]) is a neighbourhood in the Bemowo district of Warsaw, Poland. It is a housing estate with mid- and high-rise apartment buildings, located between Górczewska, Powstańców Śląskich, Czułchowska, and Lazurowa Streets, within the City Information System area of Jelonki Północne. It includes the Górczewska Park in its centre, and features two stations of the Warsaw Metro, Bemowo and Lazurowa. The neighbourhood was constructed between 1976 and 1981.

== Toponomy ==
The neighbourhood is named after Górczewska Street, which in turn is called after the nearby neighbourhood of Górce.

== History ==
The housing estate was designed by architect Krzysztof Tauszyński, and built between 1976 and 1981. It was developed around Górczewska Street, Powstańców Śląskich Street, Czułchowska Street, and Lazurowa Street, with mid- and high-rise apartment buildings, constructed in the large panel system technique. In 1980, the Górczewska Park was developed in the centre of the neighbourhood, between its buildings. In 1992, a tram line trackes were constructed alongside Górczewska, and Powstańców Śląskich Streets. In 2015, it was expanded to the north alongside Górczewska Street.

In 1995, the Church of Mary the Mother of God, belonging to the Catholic denomination, was built at 13 Muszlowa Street, within the neighbourhoood.

In 2008 an amphitheatre was opened in the Górczewska Park. It was named after singer Michael Jackson, in commemoration of his only concert in Poland, which took place at the nearby Warsaw Babice Airport in 1996. In 2019, due to numerous child sexual abuse accusations against him, it was renamed to the Górczewska Amphitheatre. On 14 March 2013, the Sándor Petőfi Memorial, designed by Jerzy Teper, was unveiled in the park.

In 2022, the Bemowo station of the M2 line of the Warsaw Metro rapid transit underground system, was opened at the intersection of Górczewska and Powstańców Śląskich Streets. Since 2022, the Lazurowa station is also being constructed in the neighbourhood, at the intersection of Górczewska and Lazurowa Streets. It is planned to be opened in 2026.

== Overview ==
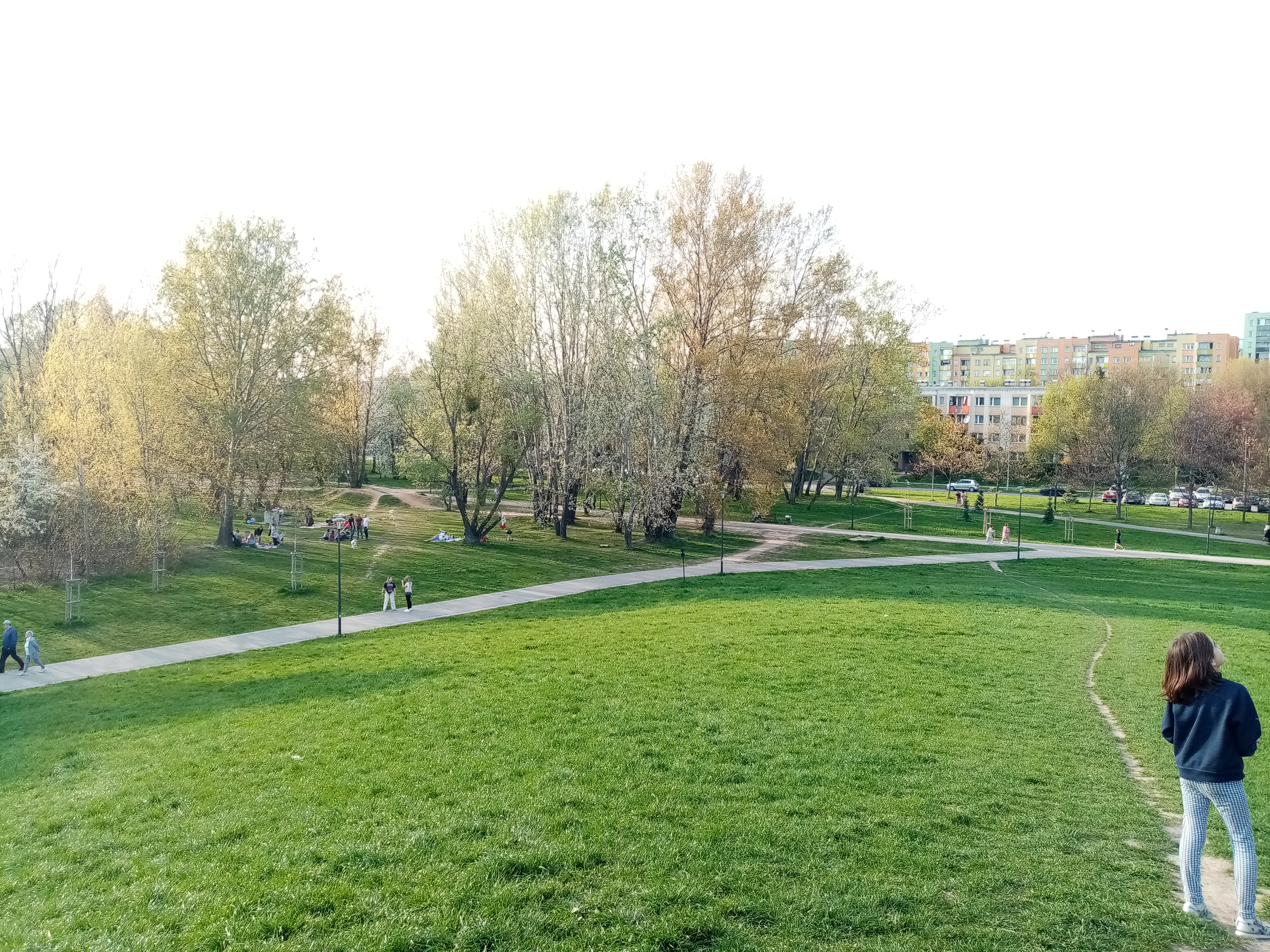
The Górczewska Park.

The neighbourhood consists of mid- and high-rise apartment buildings, constructed in the large panel system technique, placed between Górczewska Street, Powstańców Śląskich Street, Czułchowska Street, and Lazurowa Street. In its centre, it features the Górczewska Park, which includes an amphitheatre. The neighbourhood has a total area of 117 ha, and when originally opened, featured 7,400 apartments for around 25,000 inhabitants.

The area includes the Bemowo station of the M2 line of the Warsaw Metro rapid transit underground system, at the intersection of Górczewska and Powstańców Śląskich Street. Currently, at the intersection of Górczewska and Lazurowa Street, the Lazurowa station is also being built, with plans to open in 2026. Górczewska and Powstańców Śląskich Streets additionally have tracks of the tram network.

The neighbourhood also includes the Church of Mary the Mother of God, which belongs to the Catholic denomination, and is located at 13 Muszlowa Street.
