= Jawczyce =

Jawczyce may refer to:

- Jawczyce, Lesser Poland Voivodeship, a village in the administrative district of Gmina Biskupice, Wieliczka County, Poland
- Jawczyce, Masovian Voivodeship, a village in the administrative district of Gmina Ożarów Mazowiecki, Warsaw West County, Poland
