= Piotrkówek Duży =

- Village
- Location within Poland
- Coordinates: 52°13′N 20°49′E
- Country: Poland
- Voivodeship: Masovian
- County: Warsaw West
- Gmina: Ożarów Mazowiecki
- Population: 70

Piotrkówek Duży [pjɔtrˈkuvɛk ˈduʐɨ] is a village in the administrative district of Gmina Ożarów Mazowiecki, within Warsaw West County, Masovian Voivodeship, in east-central Poland.
