= Kaputy =

- Village
- Location within Poland
- Coordinates: 52°13′50″N 20°47′18″E
- Country: Poland
- Voivodeship: Masovian
- County: Warsaw West
- Gmina: Ożarów Mazowiecki
- Population: 150

Kaputy [kaˈputɨ] is a village in the administrative district of Gmina Ożarów Mazowiecki, within Warsaw West County, Masovian Voivodeship, in east-central Poland.
