= Ołtarzew =

- Village
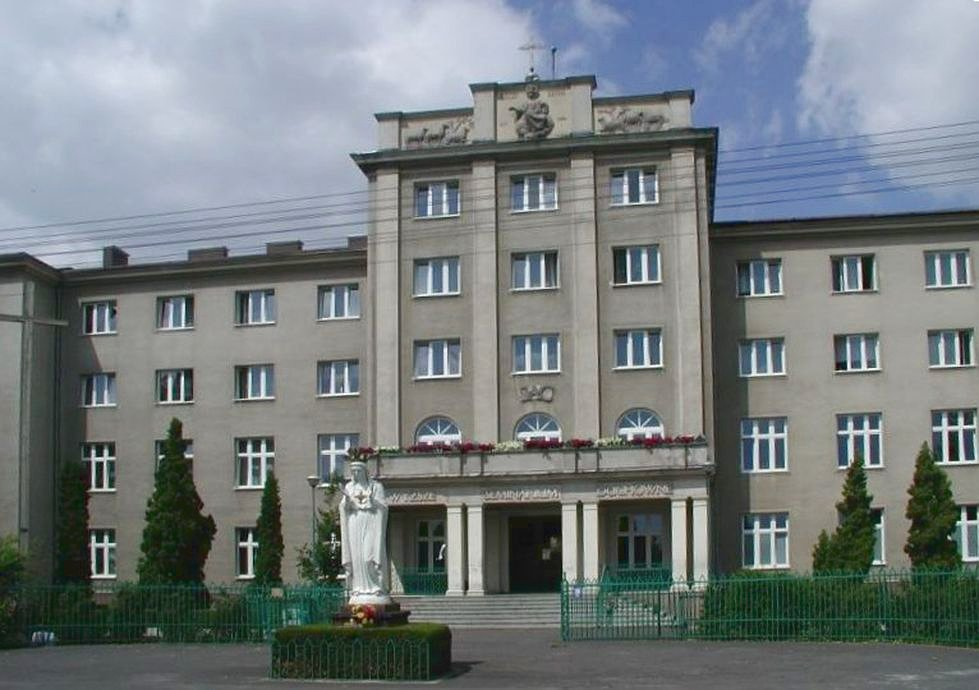
- The main building of the Pallotine Seminary

- Location within Poland
- Coordinates: 52°13′N 20°47′E
- Country: Poland
- Voivodeship: Masovian
- County: Warsaw West
- Gmina: Ożarów Mazowiecki

Ołtarzew [ɔu̯ˈtaʐɛf] is a village in the administrative district of Gmina Ożarów Mazowiecki, within Warsaw West County, Masovian Voivodeship, in east-central Poland.
