= Pilaszków, Masovian Voivodeship =

Pilaszków
- Village
- Location within Poland
- Coordinates: 52°14′4″N 20°40′34″E
- Country: Poland
- Voivodeship: Masovian
- County: Warsaw West
- Gmina: Ożarów Mazowiecki

Pilaszków [piˈlaʂkuf] is a village in the administrative district of Gmina Ożarów Mazowiecki, within Warsaw West County, Masovian Voivodeship, in east-central Poland.
