= Myszczyn =

- Village
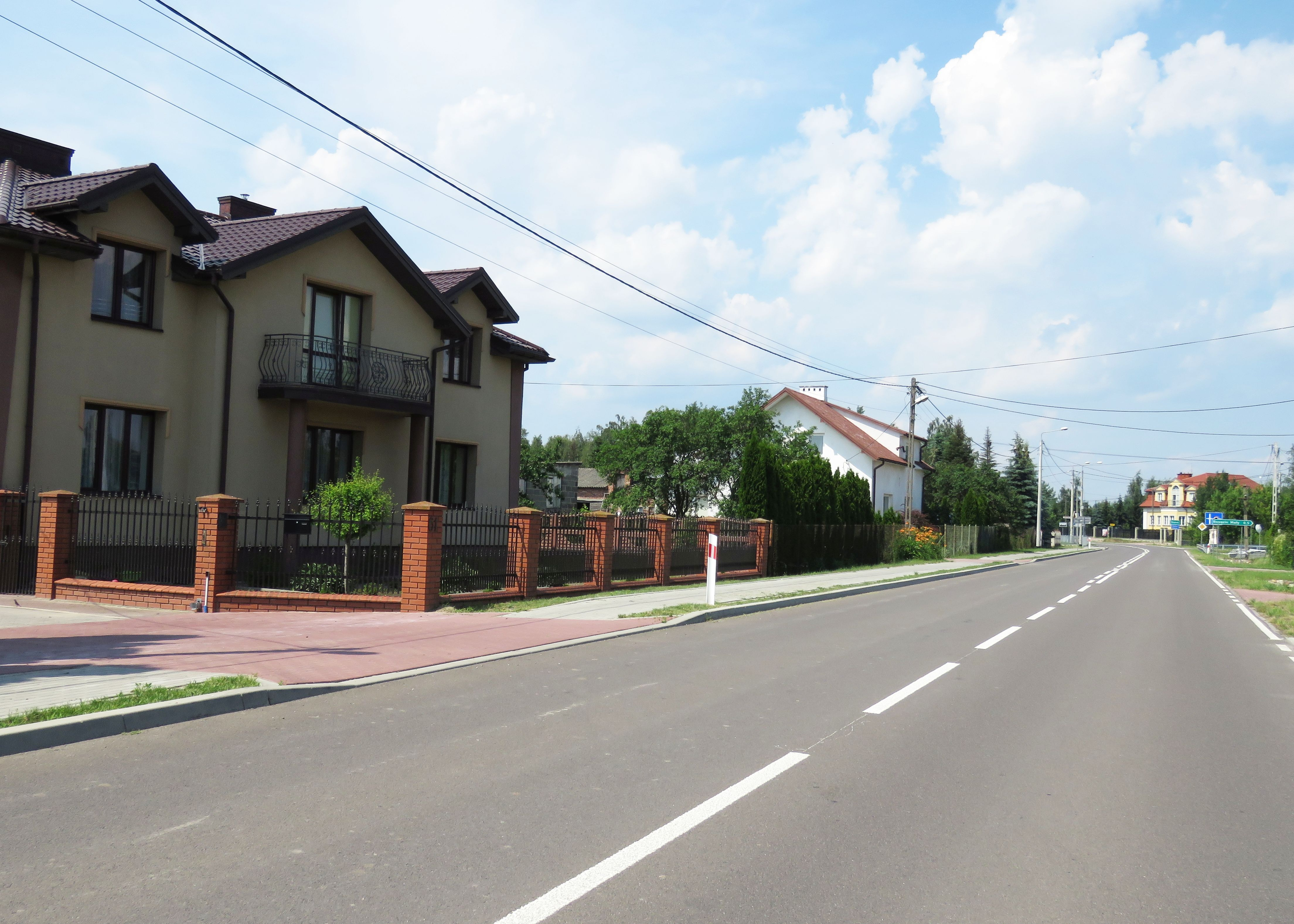

- Location within Poland
- Coordinates: 52°14′N 20°41′E
- Country: Poland
- Voivodeship: Masovian
- County: Warsaw West
- Gmina: Ożarów Mazowiecki
- Time zone: UTC+1 (CET)
  - Summer (DST): UTC+2 (CEST)

Myszczyn [ˈmɨʂt͡ʂɨn] is a village in the administrative district of Gmina Ożarów Mazowiecki, within Warsaw West County, Masovian Voivodeship, in east-central Poland.

Six Polish citizens were murdered by Nazi Germany in the village during World War II.
