= Friendship Estate =

Neighbourhood in Warsaw, Poland

- Neighbourhood
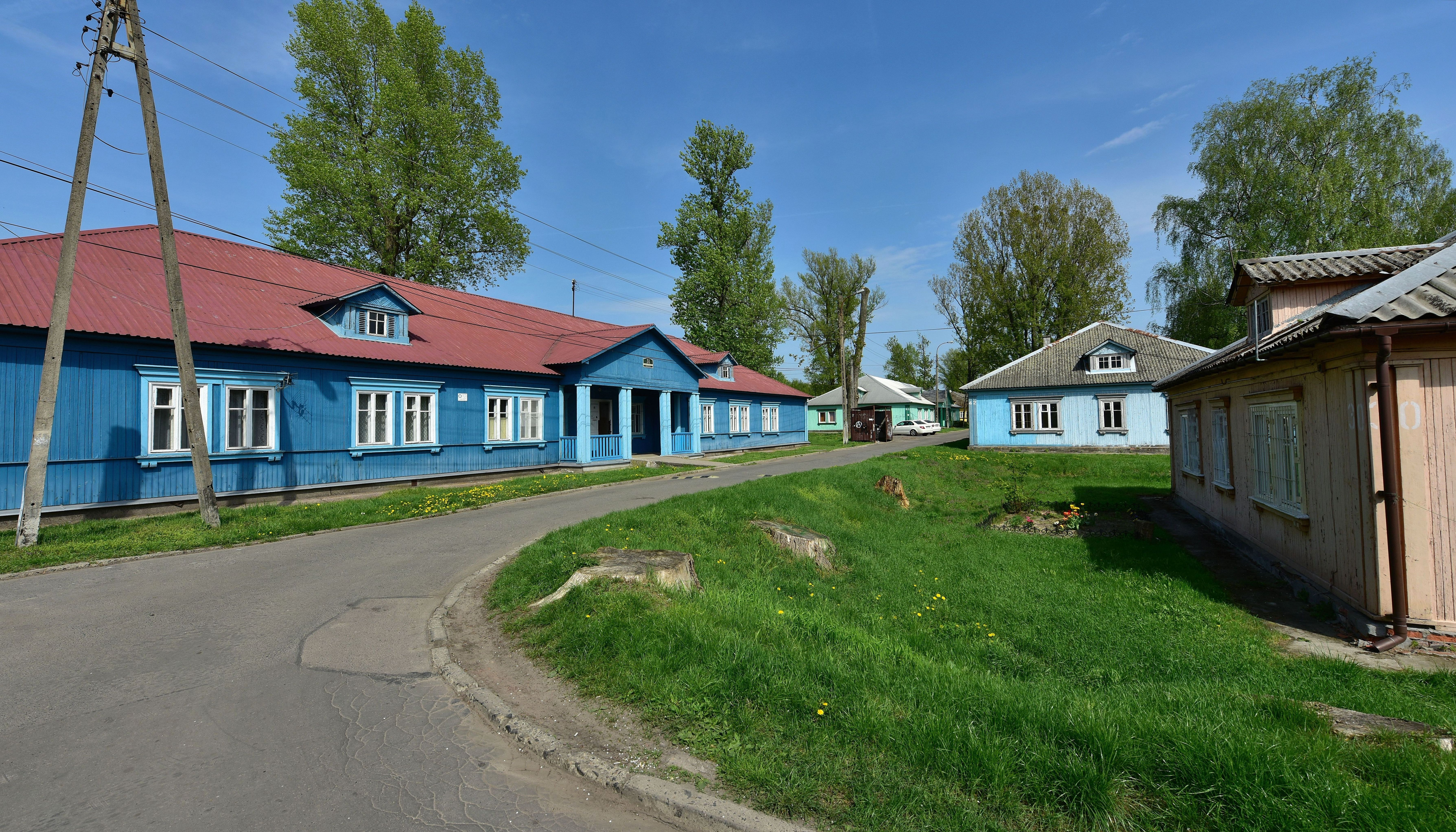
- Houses in the Friendship Estate in 2018.
- Interactive map of Friendship Estate
- Coordinates: 52°14′14″N 20°55′09″E
- Country: Poland
- Voivodeship: Masovian
- City and county: Warsaw
- District: Bemowo
- City Information System area: Jelonki Północne
- Establishment: 1952

Government
  - Alderman: Rafał Trzaskowski
- Time zone: UTC+1 (CET)
  - Summer (DST): UTC+2 (CEST)
- Area code: +48 22

The Friendship Estate (Polish: Osiedle Przyjaźń) is a neighbourhood in the Bemowo district of Warsaw, Poland, located within the City Information System area of Jelonki Północne. It is a low-rise residential area with housing for university students and employees. Its characteristic wooden buildings are listed on the regional heritage list.

The neighbourhood was built in 1952, to provide housing for the several thousand labourers from the Soviet Union, employed at the construction of the Palace of Culture and Science. Following its completion in 1955, it was repurposed to provide housing for university students and teachers.

== History ==
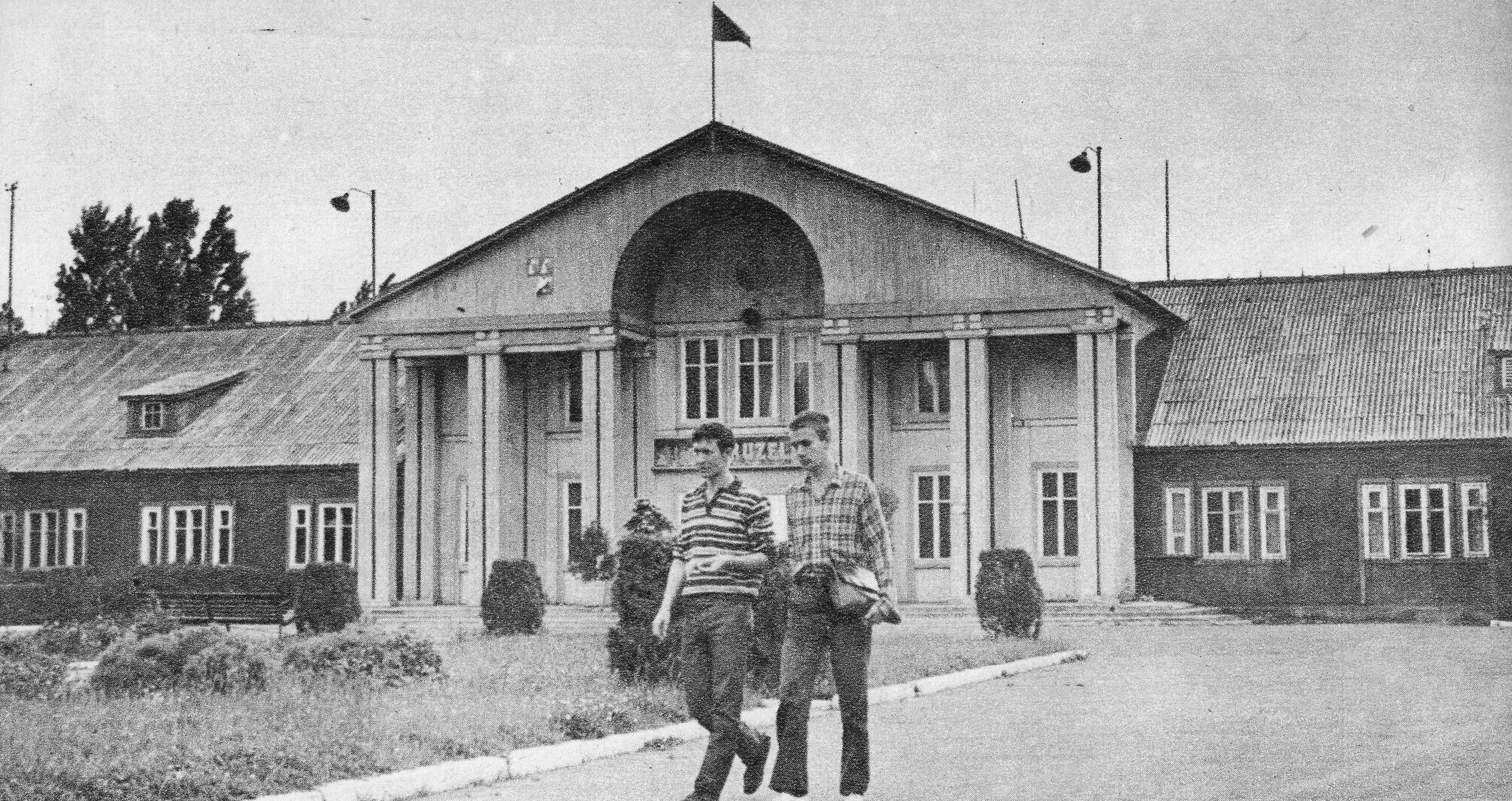
The student club Karuzela in the Friendship Estate in 1971.

The neighbourhood was developed on the lands belonging to the villages of Górce and Jelonki, which were incorporated into Warsaw on 14 May 1951.

In 1952, the Polish–Soviet Friendship Estate, (Note: Polish: Osiedle Przyjaźni Polsko-Radzieckiej; Russian: Усадьба польско-советской дружбы, romanized: Usadba polsko-sovetskoy druzhby) was developed in an area of 40 ha. It provided housing for several thousand labourers from the Soviet Union, employed at the construction of the Palace of Culture and Science. The government acquired the land from the owners via the compulsory purchase. They were offered financial compensation or different parcels in Warsaw or in the so-called Recovered Territories in western and northern Poland.

Two types of wooden buildings were built in the neighbourhood; pavilions with suites for labourers and single-family detached houses for technicians. They were shipped in prefabricated pieces to the city, and assembled on site. They were painted in two colour schemes, blue and white, and blue and red. The pavilions were designed to look like historic Polish manor houses. According to some sources, a portion of the buildings were shipped from the prisoner-of-war camp Stalag I-B near Olsztynek, Poland. The neighbourhood also included a cinema, a student club, a bathhouse, a medical clinic, a boiler room, and two pitches. Around 8 km of internal roads and streets were built, and over 4 thousand trees and 40 thousand bushes were planted. A fence surrounded the neighbourhood. In 1952, it was connected to a sewage network, with the construction of the nearby pumping station.

At its peak, the neighbourhood had 4,500 inhabitants. Numerous festivals, Polish and Soviet youth meetings, and sports competitions were hosted there. After the end of the construction of the Palace of Culture and Science in 1955, the neighbourhood was given by the city to the Ministry of Higher Education, which designated it for student housing for the universities in the city. In September 1955, it was inhabited by 3,000 students, as well as university employees. It was then renamed to the Friendship Estate. New 33 student houses, 9 hotels for teaching assistant, and 77 single-family houses and 2 hotels for university employees were built in the neighbourhood, in an area of 32 ha. It was connected with the rest of the city via two bus lines. The student festival Jelonkalia has also begun being hosted annually.

In 1978, the neighbourhood was inhabited by 1190 teaching assistants and university employees, together with their families, as well as 1200 students. Among them was Alpha Oumar Konaré, future President of Mali serving from 1992 to 2002.

In 2000, the Bemowo Town Hall, which houses the district government, was built at 70 Powstańców Śląskich Street, as well as several more student houses, as well as a tramline alongside the road.

Currently, the neighbourhood is a property of the State Treasury of Poland, and is administered by the mayor of Warsaw, as the alderman. From 2012 to 2024, it was leased and administered by the Maria Grzegorzewska Pedagogical University. After the agreement was not renewed, it was returned to the city.

In 2022, the Bemowo station of the M2 line of the Warsaw Metro rapid transit underground system, was opened at the corner of Górczewska and Powstańców Śląskich Streets.

In 2024, the neighbourhood was inhabited by over 1,000 students. The same year, it was entered into the regional heritage list.

== Overview ==
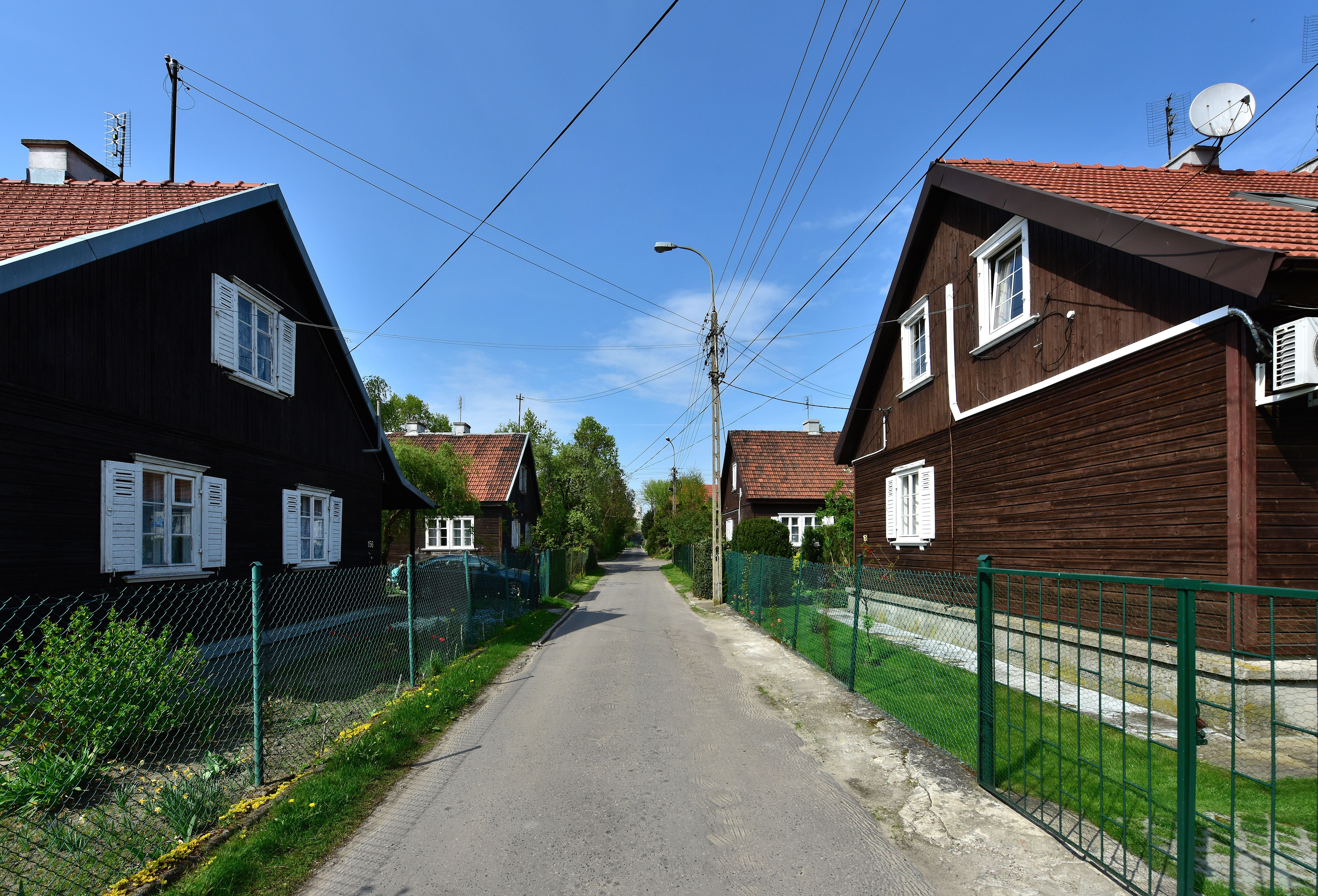
The wooden detached houses in the Friendship Estate, in 2018.

The neighbourhood is a residential area, with housing for students and employees of the city's universities. The majority of its area consists of low-rise student dormitory pavilions, and single-family detached houses in the neighbourhood's southwestern quarter for the teachers and professors. It also features a student club, a library, and two pitches. The majority of its buildings, made of wood and dating to 1952, are listed in the regional heritage list. In 2024, the neighbourhood was inhabited by over 3,000 students.

The neighbourhood is a property of the State Treasury of Poland, and is administered by the mayor of Warsaw, as the alderman.

It also includes the Bemowo station of the M2 line of the Warsaw Metro rapid transit underground system, at the corner of Górczewska and Powstańców Śląskich Streets, as well as a tram line on Powstańców Śląskich Street.

Additionally, the Bemowo Town Hall, which houses the city district government, is located at 70 Powstańców Śląskich Street.

== Boundaries ==
The neighbourhood borders are determined by Górczewska Street to the north, the tracks of the railway line no. 509 to the east, Olbrachta Street to the south, and Powstańców Śląskich Street to the west.
