= Na Wyraju =

Neighbourhood of Warsaw, Poland

- Neighbourhood
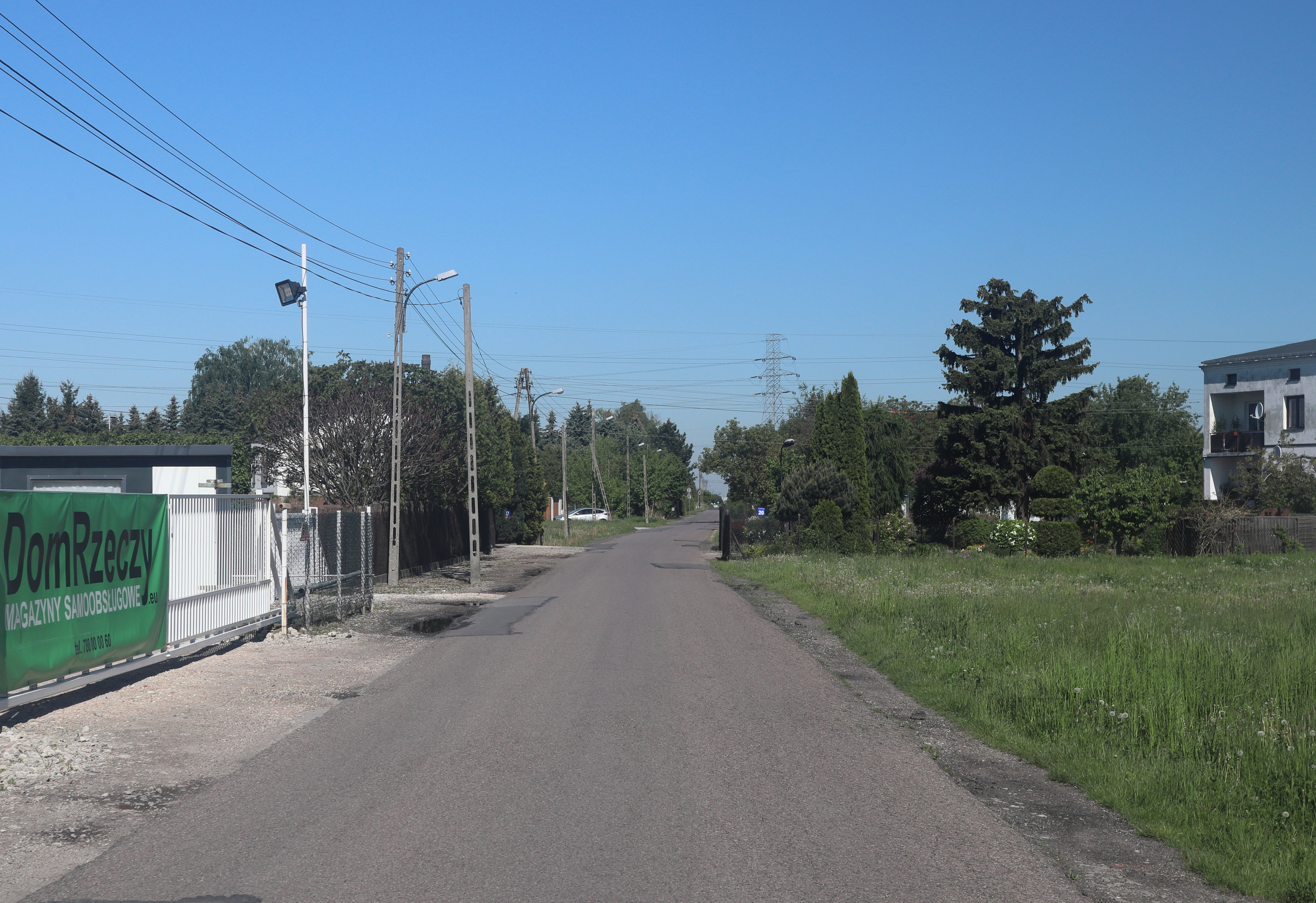
- Sochaczewska Street in Na Wyraju, in 2021.
- Interactive map of Na Wyraju
- Coordinates: 52.220395°N 20.880308°E
- Country: Poland
- Voivodeship: Masovian
- City and county: Warsaw
- District: Bemowo
- City Information System area: Chrzanów
- Time zone: UTC+1 (CET)
  - Summer (DST): UTC+2 (CEST)
- Area code: +48 22

Na Wyraju (Polish: [ˈna vɘ̟ˈra.ju]) is a neighbourhood in Warsaw, Poland, within the Bemowo district, and the City Information System area of Chrzanów. It consists of single-family detached houses and warehouses, in the area of the corner of Na Wyraju and Sochaczewska Streets.
