= Orły, Masovian Voivodeship =

Orły
- Village
- Location within Poland
- Coordinates: 52°13′17″N 20°41′5″E
- Country: Poland
- Voivodeship: Masovian
- County: Warsaw West
- Gmina: Ożarów Mazowiecki

Orły [ˈɔrwɨ] is a village in the administrative district of Gmina Ożarów Mazowiecki, within Warsaw West County, Masovian Voivodeship, in east-central Poland.
