= Kręczki =

- Village
- Location within Poland
- Coordinates: 52°14′24″N 20°47′3″E
- Country: Poland
- Voivodeship: Masovian
- County: Warsaw West
- Gmina: Ożarów Mazowiecki

Kręczki [ˈkrɛnt͡ʂki] is a village in the administrative district of Gmina Ożarów Mazowiecki, within Warsaw West County, Masovian Voivodeship, in east-central Poland.
