= Święcice, Masovian Voivodeship =

Święcice
- Village
- Location within Poland
- Coordinates: 52°12′47″N 20°41′49″E
- Country: Poland
- Voivodeship: Masovian
- County: Warsaw West
- Gmina: Ożarów Mazowiecki
- Population: 918 (2,023)

Święcice (Polish pronunciation: [ɕfjɛɲˈt͡ɕit͡sɛ]) is a village in the administrative district of Gmina Ożarów Mazowiecki, within Warsaw West County, Masovian Voivodeship, in east-central Poland.
