= Ożarów, Masovian Voivodeship =

Ożarów
- Village
- Location within Poland
- Coordinates: 52°12′44″N 20°50′6″E
- Country: Poland
- Voivodeship: Masovian
- County: Warsaw West
- Gmina: Ożarów Mazowiecki

Ożarów [ɔˈʐaruf] is a village in the administrative district of Gmina Ożarów Mazowiecki, within Warsaw West County, Masovian Voivodeship, in east-central Poland.
