= Chrzanów metro station =

Metro station in Warsaw, Poland

Chrzanów
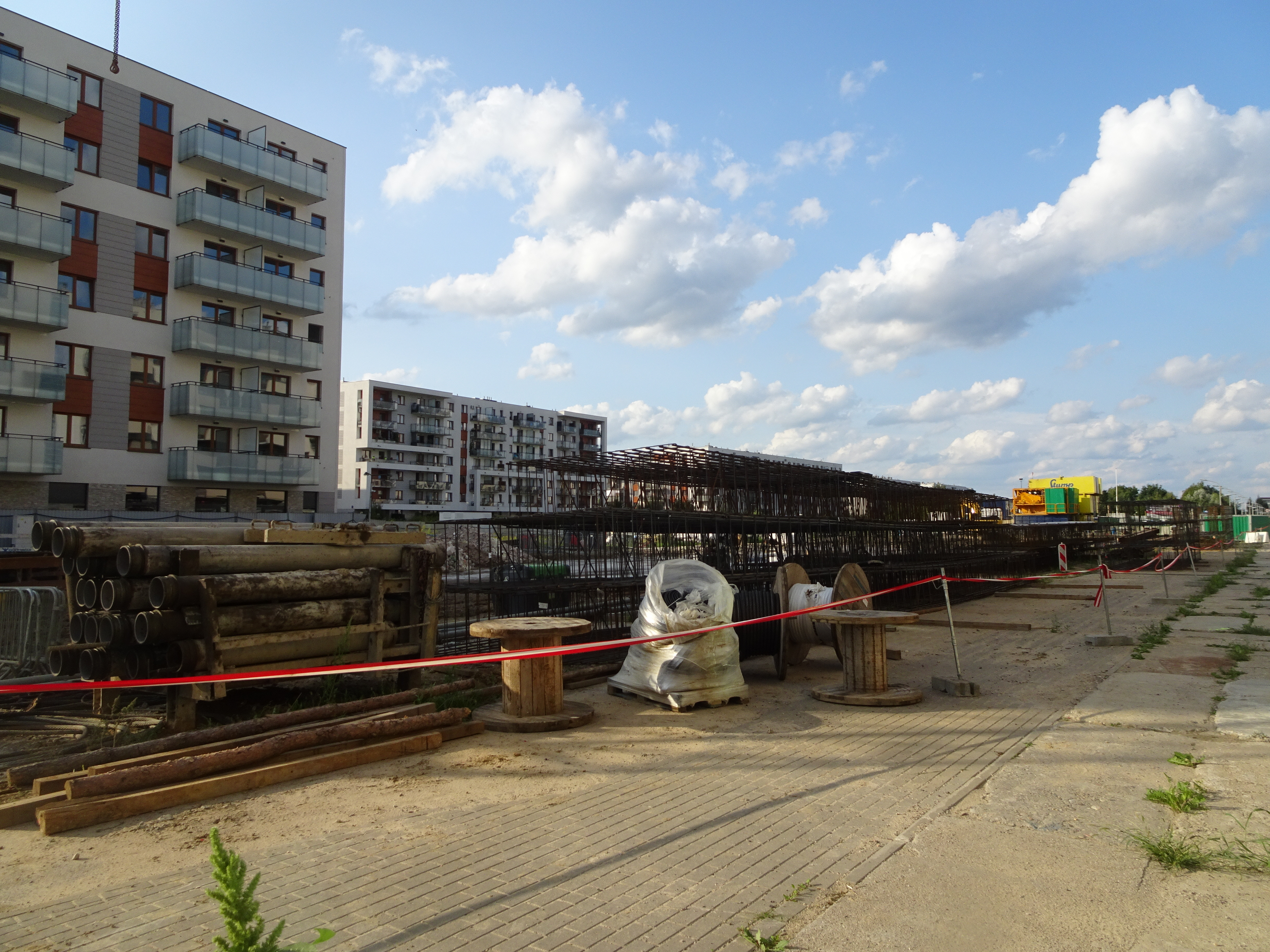
- Construction of the Chrzanów station (2023)

General information
- Coordinates: 52°13′37″N 20°53′22″E
- Owner: ZTM Warszawa
- Platforms: 1 island platform
- Tracks: 2
- Connections: 743

Construction
- Structure type: Underground
- Platform levels: 1

Other information
- Station code: C-2
- Fare zone: 1

History
- Opened: 2027 (planned)

Services
Preceding station	Warsaw Metro	Following station
Karolin towards Bemowo	M2 line	Lazurowa towards Bródno
Location
- Location within Warsaw

Chrzanów is a future metro station on the western part of Line M2 of the Warsaw Metro. It is located in the vicinity of Rayskiego and Szeligowska streets, in the Bemowo district. The opening of the station is planned for 2027.

The station will be local, mainly servicing nearby flats and houses.

== History ==
Construction of the station, together with the nearby Lazurowa and Karolin metro stations started in 2022.

It is set to be opened by 2027.
