= Płochocin, Masovian Voivodeship =

Płochocin
- Village
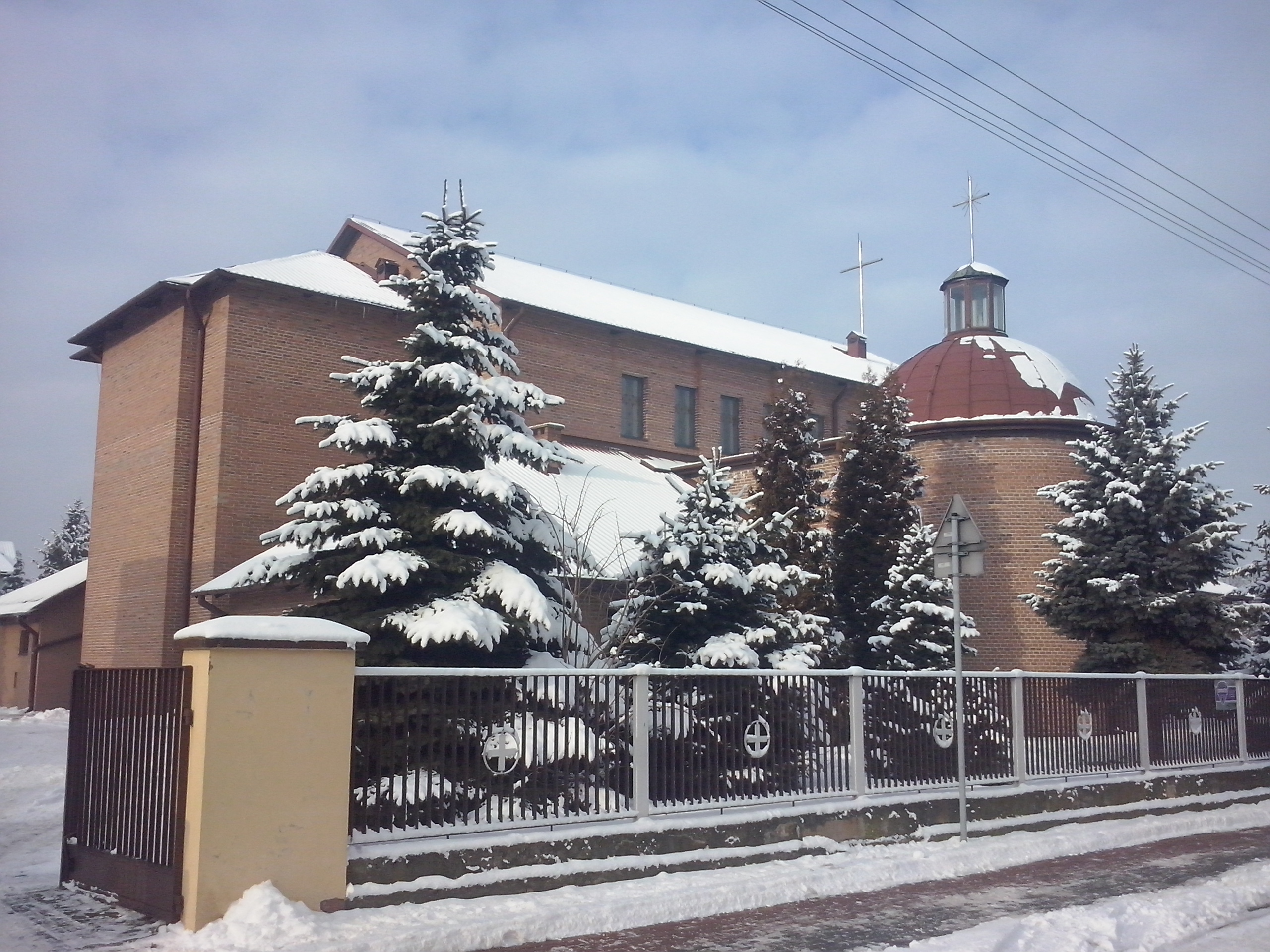
- Church of Saint Adalbert

- Location within Poland
- Coordinates: 52°12′0″N 20°43′16″E
- Country: Poland
- Voivodeship: Masovian
- County: Warsaw West
- Gmina: Ożarów Mazowiecki

Płochocin [pwɔˈxɔt͡ɕin] is a village in the administrative district of Gmina Ożarów Mazowiecki, within Warsaw West County, Masovian Voivodeship, in east-central Poland.

On 14 September 1939 German Wehrmacht soldiers executed 4 persons in the village.
