= Gmina Ożarów Mazowiecki =

Gmina Ożarów Mazowiecki Ożarów Mazowiecki Commune
- Gmina
- Flag Coat of arms
- Interactive map of Gmina Ożarów Mazowiecki
- Coordinates (Ożarów Mazowiecki): 52°13′N 20°48′E
- Country: Poland
- Voivodeship: Masovian
- County: Warsaw West
- Seat: Ożarów Mazowiecki

Area
  - Total: 71.34 km^{2} (27.54 sq mi)

Population (2023)
  - Total: 31,145
  - Density: 436.6/km^{2} (1,131/sq mi)
  - Urban: 15,623
  - Rural: 15,911
- Website: http://www.ozarow-mazowiecki.pl

Gmina Ożarów Mazowiecki is an urban-rural gmina (administrative district) in Warsaw West County, Masovian Voivodeship, in east-central Poland. Its seat is the town of Ożarów Mazowiecki, which lies approximately 14 kilometres (9 mi) west of Warsaw.

The gmina covers an area of 71.34 square kilometres (27.5 sq mi), and as of 2023 its total population is 31,145 (out of which the population of Ożarów Mazowiecki amounts to 15,623 and the population of the rural part of the gmina is 15,911).

== Villages ==
Apart from the town of Ożarów Mazowiecki, Gmina Ożarów Mazowiecki contains the villages and settlements of Bronisze, Duchnice, Gołaszew, Jawczyce, Kaputy, Konotopa, Koprki, Kręczki, Macierzysz, Michałówek, Mory, Myszczyn, Ołtarzew, Orły, Orły-Kolonia, Ożarów, Pilaszków, Piotrkówek Duży, Piotrkówek Mały, Płochocin, Pogroszew, Pogroszew-Kolonia, Strzykuły, Święcice, Szeligi, Umiastów, Wieruchów, Wolica and Wolskie.

== Neighbouring gminas ==
Gmina Ożarów Mazowiecki is bordered by Warsaw, by the town of Piastów, and by the gminas of Błonie, Brwinów, Leszno and Stare Babice.
