= Aleksandrów, Garwolin County =

Aleksandrów
- Village
- Location within Poland
- Coordinates: 51°48′56″N 21°32′42″E
- Country: Poland
- Voivodeship: Masovian
- County: Garwolin
- Gmina: Łaskarzew

Aleksandrów [alɛkˈsandruf] is a village in the administrative district of Gmina Łaskarzew, within Garwolin County, Masovian Voivodeship, in east-central Poland.
