= Sándor Petőfi Memorial =

Monument in Warsaw, Poland

Sándor Petőfi
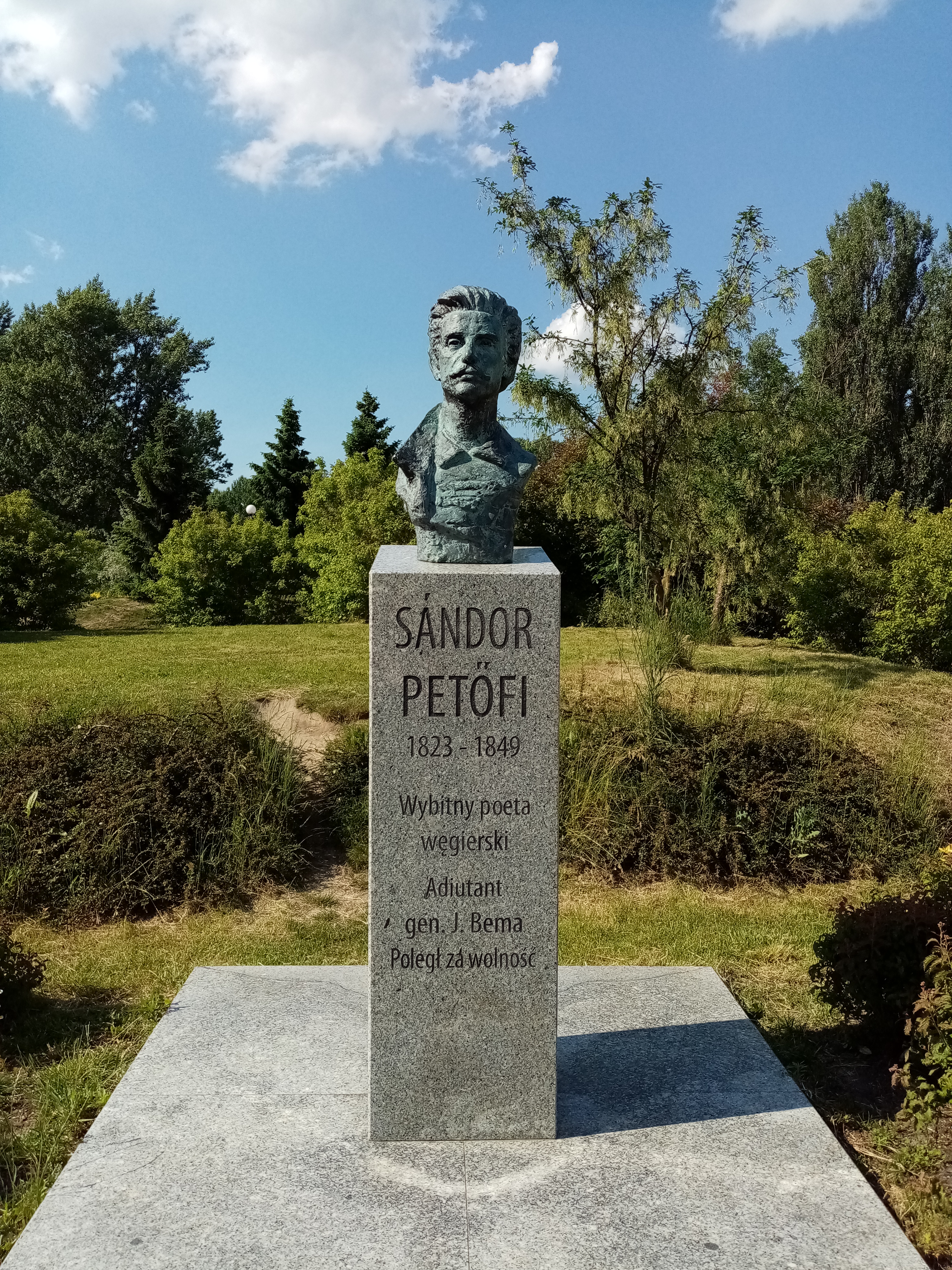
- The statue in 2022.
- Interactive map of Sándor Petőfi
- Location: Górczewska Park, Bemowo, Warsaw, Poland
- Coordinates: 52°13′59.8″N 20°54′23.3″E
- Designer: Jerzy Teper
- Type: Statue
- Material: Bronze
- Opening date: 14 March 2013
- Dedicated to: Sándor Petőfi

The Sándor Petőfi Memorial (Hungarian pronunciation: [ˈʃaːndor ˈpɛtøːfi]; Polish: Pomnik Sándora Petőfiego; Hungarian: Petőfi Sándor szobor) is a monument in Warsaw, Poland, placed in the Górczewska Park, within the Bemowo district. It consists of a bust sculpture of Sándor Petőfi, a 19th-century poet and liberal revolutionary, who was one of the key figures of the Hungarian Revolution of 1848. It was designed by Jerzy Teper, and unveiled on 14 March 2013.

== History ==
The monument dedicated to Sándor Petőfi, was proposed by the Association of Hungarian–Polish Friendship Societies, and was financed by the Foundation for Culture and Art Beyond Borders and the Minister of Foreign Affairs of Hungary. The sculpture was designed by Jerzy Teper. It was unveiled on 14 March 2013, a day prior to the 165th anniversary of the Hungarian Revolution of 1848, in which Petőfi fought. It was also the anniversary of the birth of Józef Bem, who was the general commanding Petőfi, and is the namesake of the Bemowo city district, in which the monument is placed in.

The unveiling ceremony was attended by Sándor Lezsák, the Deputy Speaker of the National Assembly, Miklós Csomós, the deputy mayor of Budapest, and Balázs Bús, the mayor of Óbuda-Békásmegyer, a district in Budapest, which has a cooperation agreement with Bemowo, Iván Gyurcsík, the ambassador of Hungary to Warsaw, Marek Kuchciński, the Deputy Marshal of the Sejm, as well several members of the Sejm, including Mariusz Błaszczak, Małgorzata Gosiewska, and Piotr Naimski.

== Characteristics ==
The monument consists of a bust sculpture of Sándor Petőfi, placed on a stone pedestal, which has the following inscription:

Polish inscription

Sándor Petőfi
1823–1849
Wybitny poeta węgierski
Adiutant gen. J. Bema
Poległy za wolność

Translation:
English translation

Sándor Petőfi
1823–1849
Outstanding Hungarian poet
Adjutant of general J. Bem
He died for the freedom

== Gallery ==
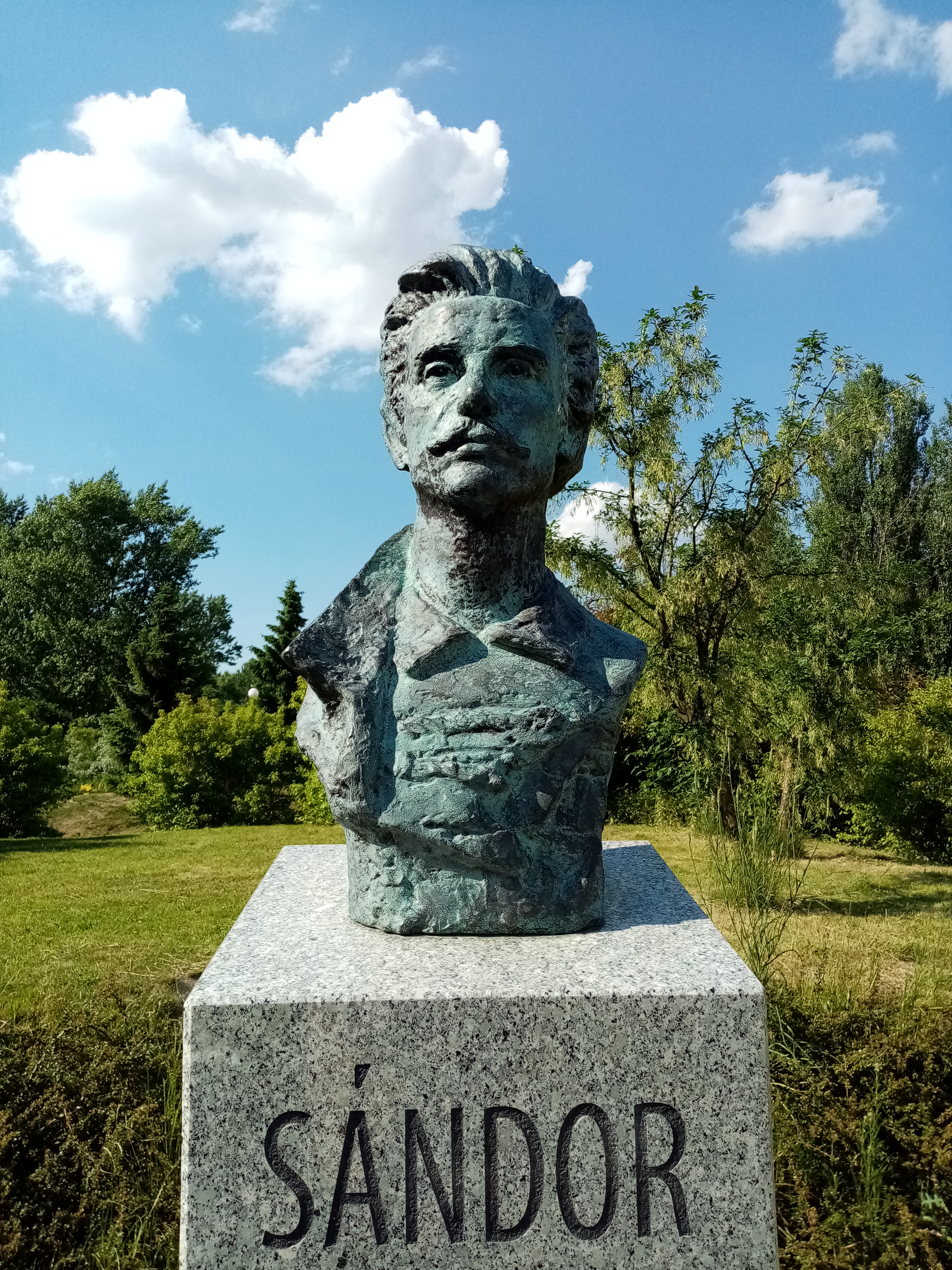
The bust of Sándor Petőfi.
