= Karolin metro station =

Metro station in Warsaw, Poland

Karolin
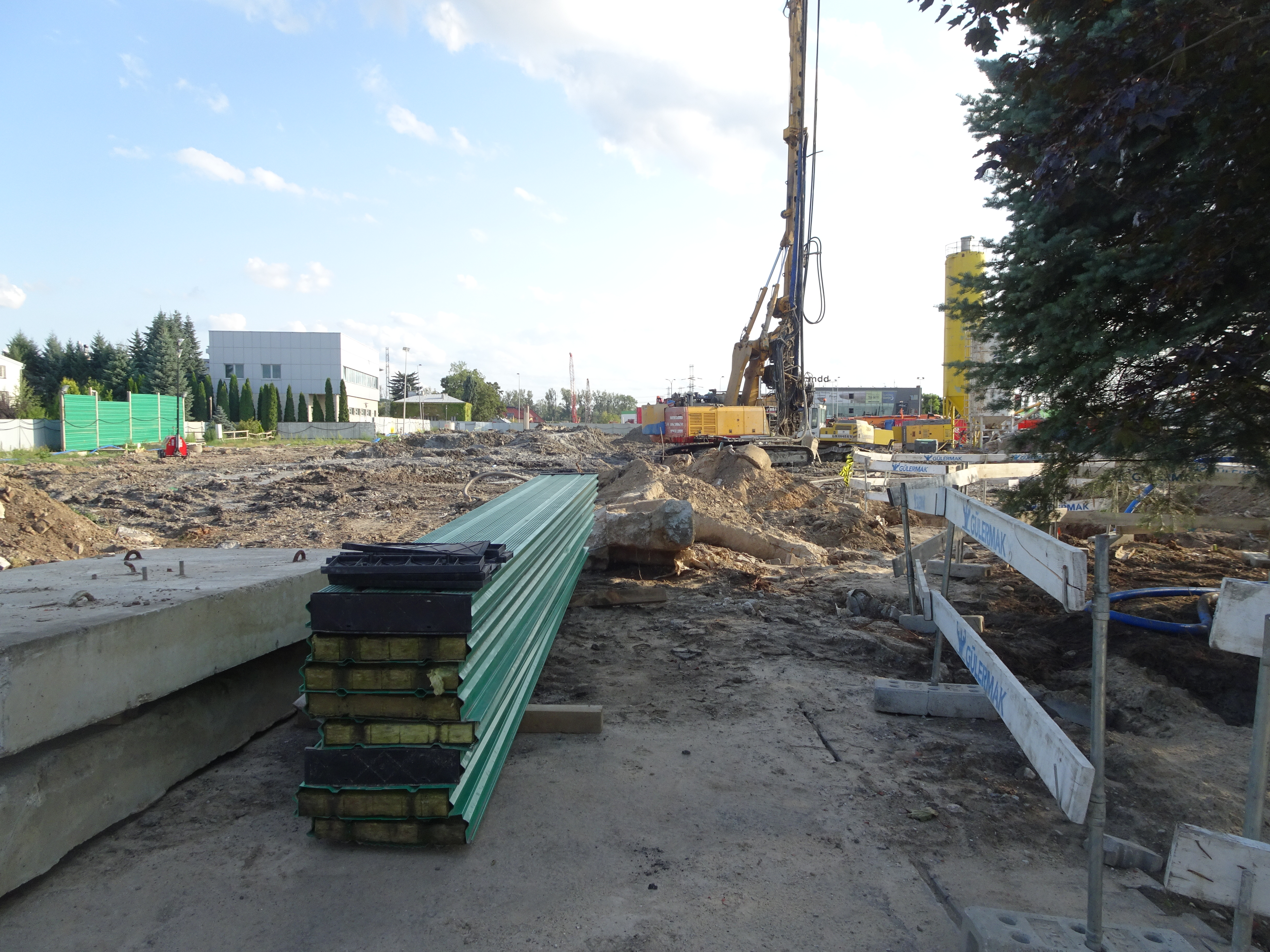
- Construction of the Karolin station (September 2023)

General information
- Coordinates: 52°12′59″N 20°53′10″E
- Owner: ZTM Warszawa
- Platforms: 1 island platform
- Tracks: 2
- Connections: 112, 713, 716

Construction
- Structure type: Underground
- Platform levels: 1

Other information
- Station code: C-1
- Fare zone: 1

History
- Opened: 2027 (planned)
- Former names: Połczyńska (in planning stages)

Services
| Preceding station | Warsaw Metro | Following station |
|---|---|---|
| Terminus | M2 line | Chrzanów towards Bródno |
Location
- Location within Warsaw

Karolin is the future terminus of the western part of Line M2 of the Warsaw Metro. It is located in the vicinity of Połczyńska and Sochaczewska streets, in the Bemowo district. The opening of the station is planned for 2027.

== History ==
The contract to build the final section of the M2 line was signed in 2018, with Gülermak being chosen as the ones to build it. The area surrounding the station is planned to hold a huge Park&Ride parking, which would service cars, city buses, and long-distance buses. Construction of the station, along with the nearby Chrzanów and Lazurowa metro stations, began in 2022. The opening of the section, consisting of 3 stations and a new depot, is planned for 2027.
