= Duchnice =

- Village
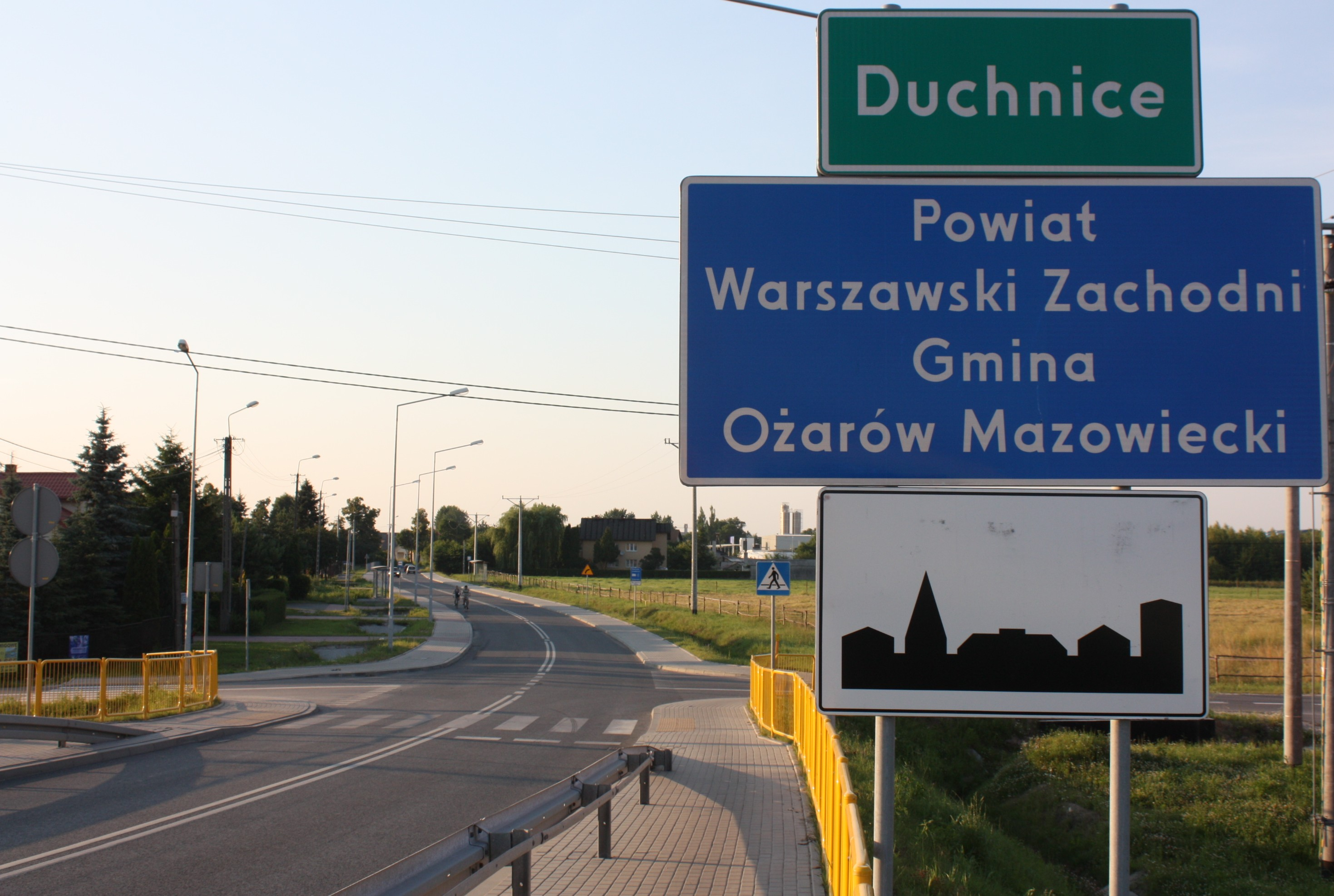

- Location within Poland
- Coordinates: 52°11′40″N 20°47′55″E
- Country: Poland
- Voivodeship: Masovian
- County: Warsaw West
- Gmina: Ożarów Mazowiecki
- Population: 858

Duchnice [duxˈnit͡sɛ] is a village in the administrative district of Gmina Ożarów Mazowiecki, within Warsaw West County, Masovian Voivodeship, in east-central Poland.
