= Górczewska Park =

Park in Warsaw, Poland

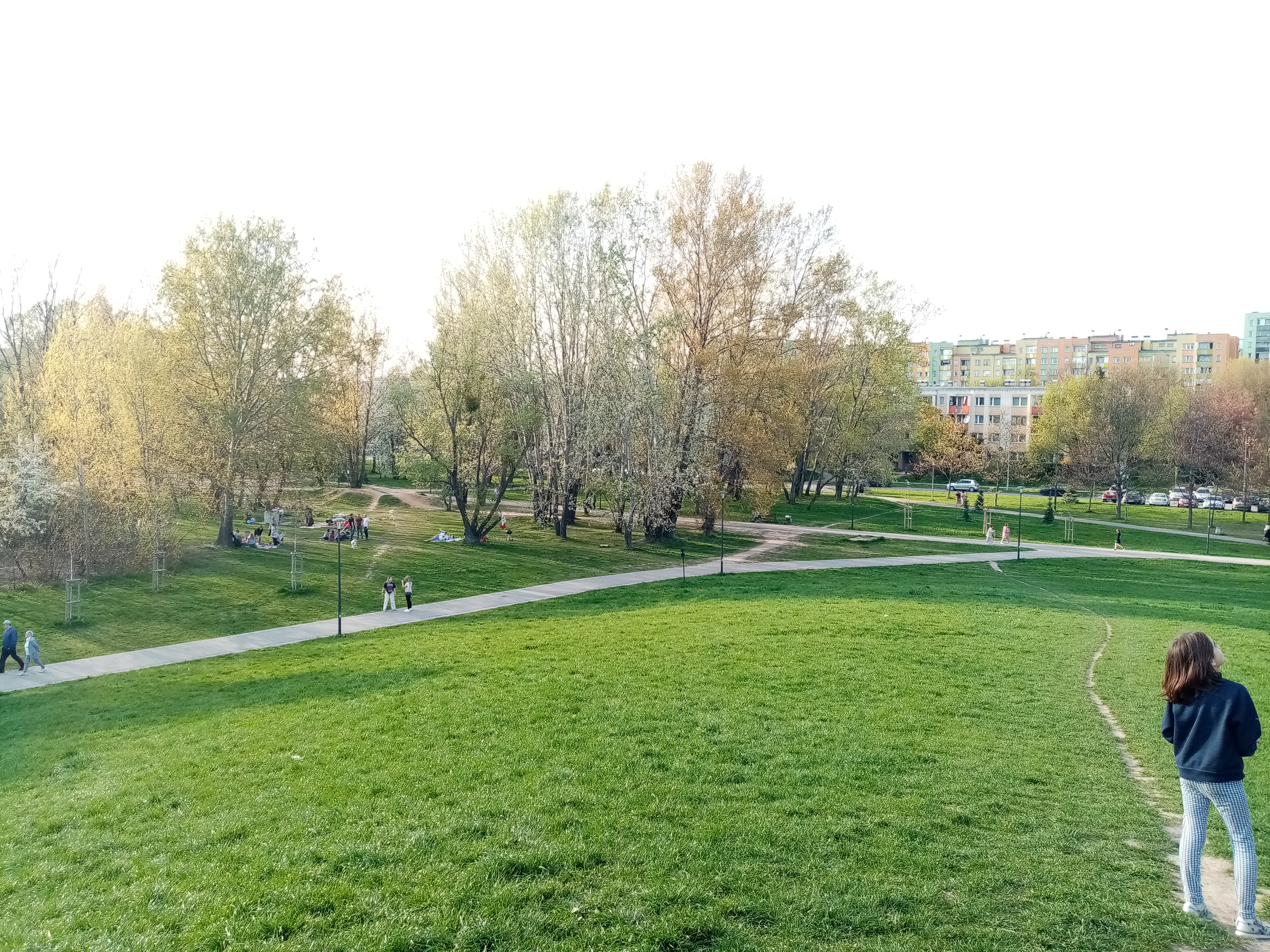
- The Górczewska Park in 2022
- Interactive map of Górczewska Park
- Type: Urban park
- Location: Bemowo, Warsaw, Poland
- Coordinates: 52°14′02″N 20°54′17″E
- Area: 20.47 hectares (50.6 acres)
- Created: 1980
- Designer: Krzysztof Tauszyński
- Public transit: Bemowo

The Górczewska Park (Polish: [ɡur.ˈt͡ʂɛv.ska]; Polish: Park Górczewska) is an urban park in Warsaw, Poland, located within the Bemowo district, between Górczewska, Powstańców Śląskich, Czułchowska, and Lazurowa Streets, in the centre of the housing estate of Górczewska. It was opened in 1980.

== Toponomy ==
The park is names after the surrounding it housing estate of Górczewska. Its name in turn comes from Górczewska Street, which is called after the nearby neighbourhood of Górce.

== History ==
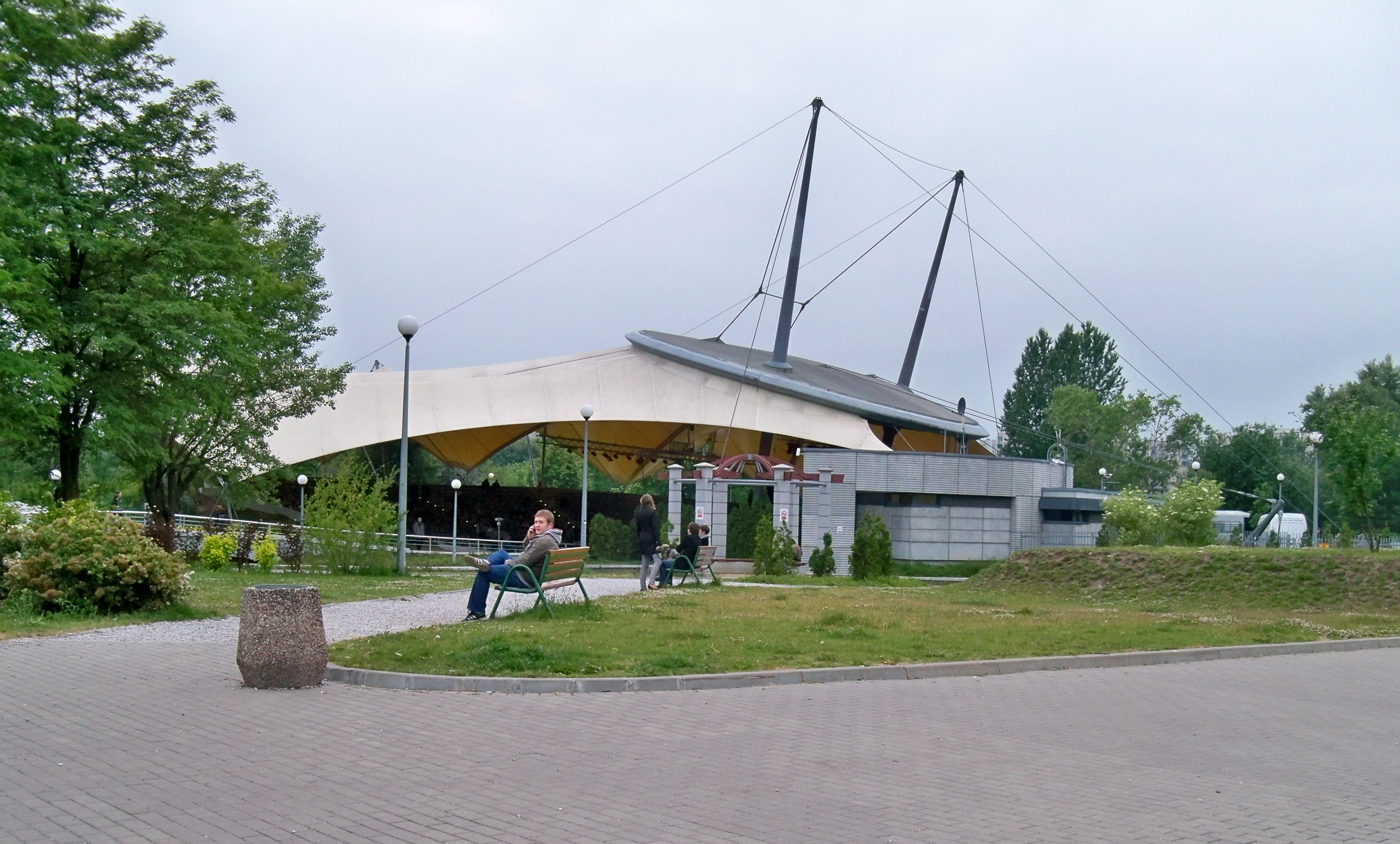
The amphitheatre in the Górczewska Park in 2012.

The park was developed in 1980, as part of the high-rise housing estate of Górczewska, designed by Krzysztof Tauszyński.

In 2008, an amphitheatre was opened in the park. It was named after singer Michael Jackson, in commemoration of his only concert in Poland, which took place at the nearby Warsaw Babice Airport in 1996. In 2019, due to numerous child sexual abuse accusations against him, it was renamed to the Górczewska Amphitheatre.

On 14 March 2013, the Sándor Petőfi Memorial, designed by Jerzy Teper, was unveiled in the park. It has a form of a bronze bust on a pedestal, and is dedicated to Sándor Petőfi, a 19th-century poet and liberal revolutionary, who was one of the key figures of the Hungarian Revolution of 1848.

== Characteristics ==
The park is located in the centre of the housing estate of Górczewska, between Górczewska, Powstańców Śląskich, Czułchowska, and Lazurowa Streets, and surrounded by mid- and high-rise apartment buildings. It has a total area of 20.47 ha. The park includes an amphitheatre, and the Sándor Petőfi Memorial, designed by Jerzy Teper. The latter has a form of a bronze bust on a pedestal, and is dedicated to Sándor Petőfi, a 19th-century poet and liberal revolutionary, who was one of the key figures of the Hungarian Revolution of 1848.

== Gallery ==
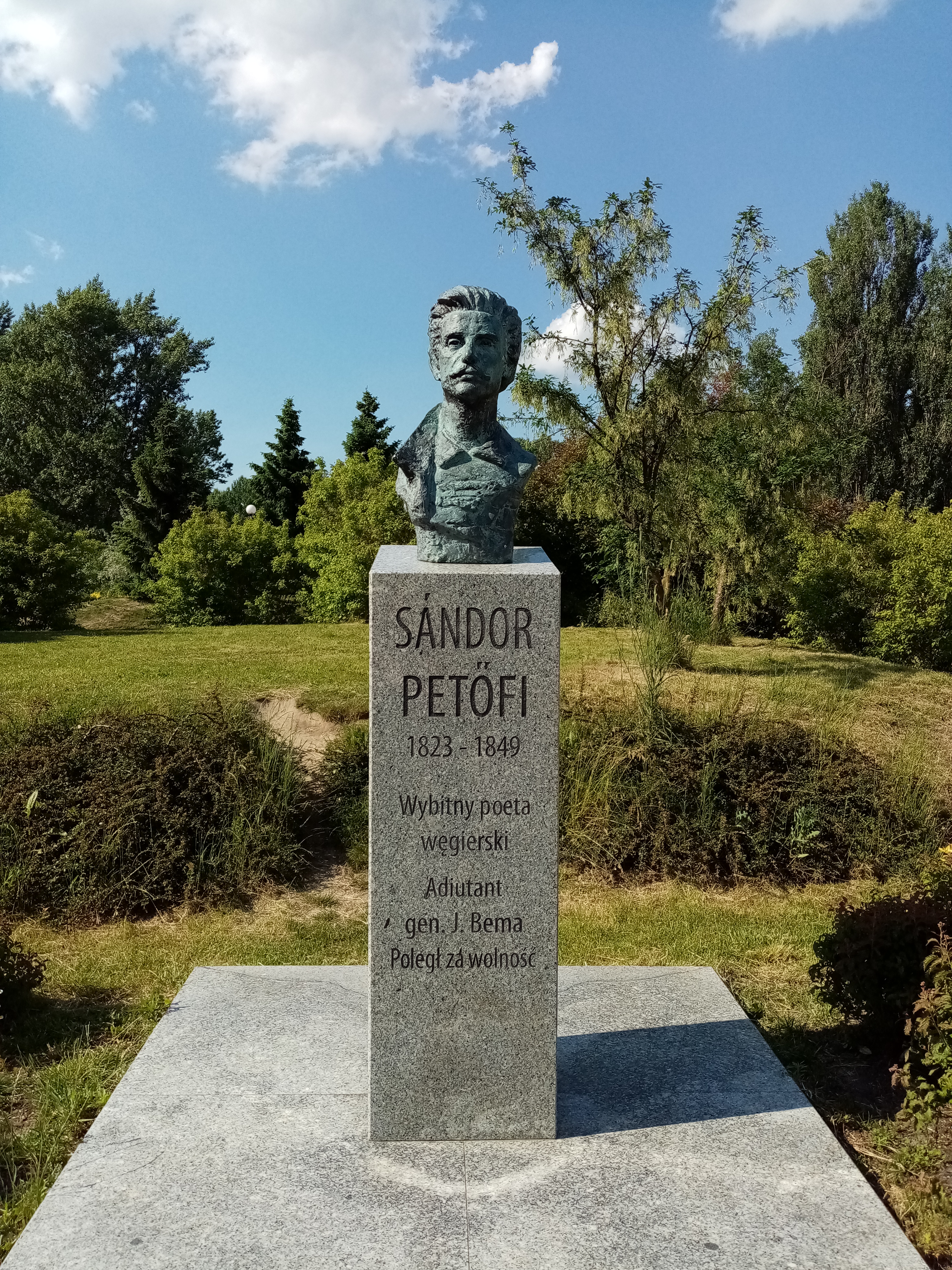
Sándor Petőfi Memorial
