= Jawczyce, Masovian Voivodeship =

Jawczyce
- Village
- Location within Poland
- Coordinates: 52°12′53″N 20°51′32″E
- Country: Poland
- Voivodeship: Masovian
- County: Warsaw West
- Gmina: Ożarów Mazowiecki

Jawczyce [jafˈt͡ʂɨt͡sɛ] is a village in the administrative district of Gmina Ożarów Mazowiecki, within Warsaw West County, Masovian Voivodeship, in east-central Poland.
