= Mory, Warsaw West County =

Mory
- Village
- Location within Poland
- Coordinates: 52°12′56″N 20°52′0″E
- Country: Poland
- Voivodeship: Masovian
- County: Warsaw West
- Gmina: Ożarów Mazowiecki

Mory [ˈmɔrɨ] is a village in the administrative district of Gmina Ożarów Mazowiecki, within Warsaw West County, Masovian Voivodeship, in east-central Poland.
