= Lazurowa metro station =

Metro station in Warsaw, Poland

Lazurowa

General information
- Coordinates: 52°14′19″N 20°53′50″E
- Owner: ZTM Warszawa
- Platforms: 1 island platform
- Tracks: 2
- Connections: 105, 122, 149, 167, 177, 189, 190, 220, 712, 714, 719, 729, 743, N42, N95; 28

Construction
- Structure type: Underground
- Platform levels: 1

Other information
- Station code: C-3
- Fare zone: 1

History
- Opened: 2027 (planned)

Services
Preceding station	Warsaw Metro	Following station
Chrzanów towards Bemowo	M2 line	Bemowo towards Bródno
Location
- Location within Warsaw

Lazurowa is a future metro station on the western part of Line M2 of the Warsaw Metro. It is located in the vicinity of Górczewska and Lazurowa streets, in the Bemowo district. The opening of the station is planned for 2027.

The station will form an important public transport hub together with the nearby bus and tram stops „Osiedle Górczewska”. It will form a quicker connection between the city centre and the city’s western suburbs.

== History ==
Construction of the station, together with the nearby Chrzanów and Karolin metro stations started in 2022.

It is set to be opened by 2027.
