= Połczyńska Street, Warsaw =

Street in Warsaw

Coordinates: 52.2169°N 20.9005°E

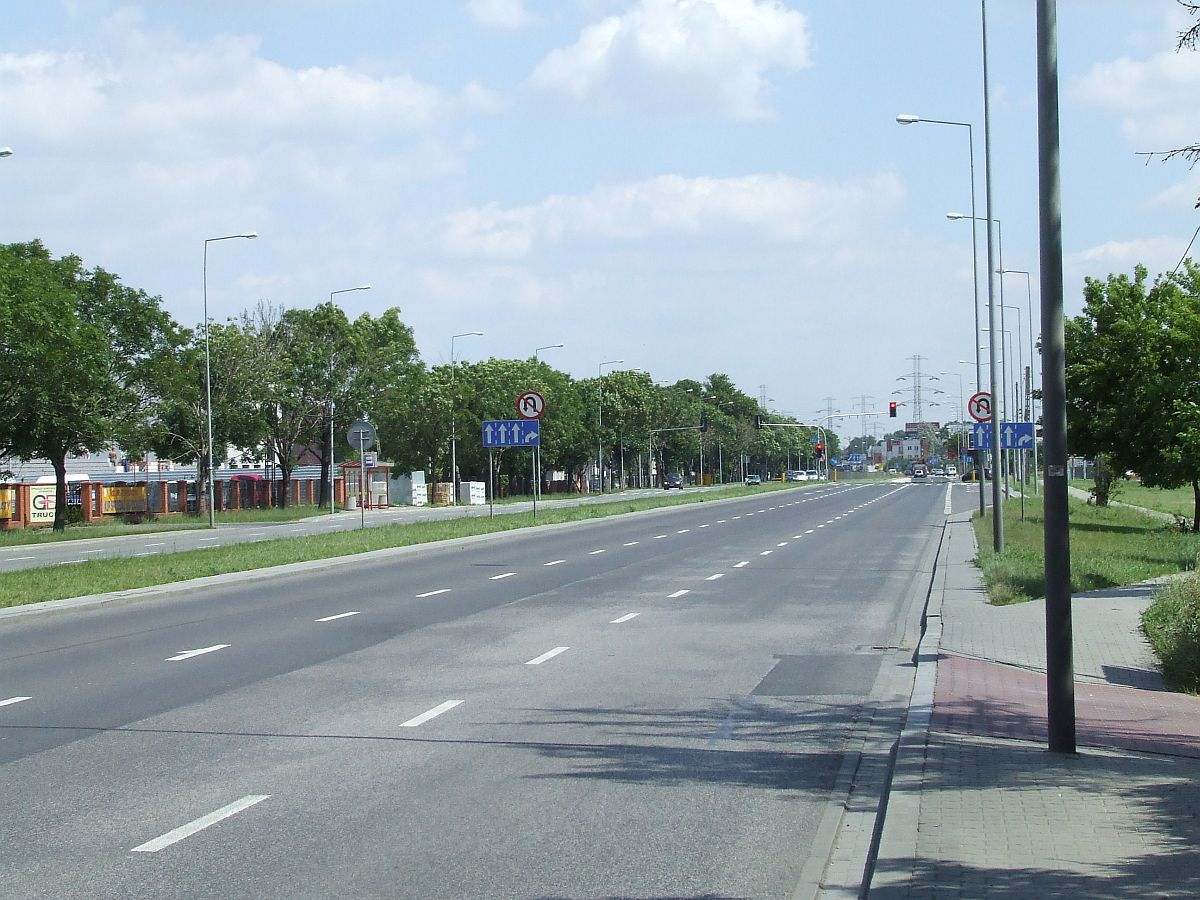
- Połczyńska Street
- Interactive map of Połczyńska Street, Warsaw
- Native name: ulica Połczyńska (Polish)
- Type: Dual carriageway thoroughfare
- Maintained by: Zarząd Dróg Miejskich
- Length: 3.5 km (2.2 mi)
- Location: Warsaw

Połczyńska Street (Polish: ulica Połczyńska, lit. Połczyn Street) is a major thoroughfare in Warsaw, Poland. Located in the western part of the city, in the borough of Bemowo, the street crosses the neighbourhoods of Chrzanów and Jelonki. It starts as a continuation of Wolska Street, crosses Powstańców Śląskich Street and leaves the city where it becomes the Poznańska Street of Ożarów Mazowiecki. Historically the street, variously known as the Kalisz Road, Poznań Road or Greater Poland Road, was the main road from Warsaw towards Błonie, Sochaczew, Kalisz and ultimately Poznań. Its entire length was formally incorporated into the city of Warsaw in 1950s.
