= Jeziorki Południowe =

Neighbourhood in Warsaw, Poland

- City Information System area (neighbourhood)
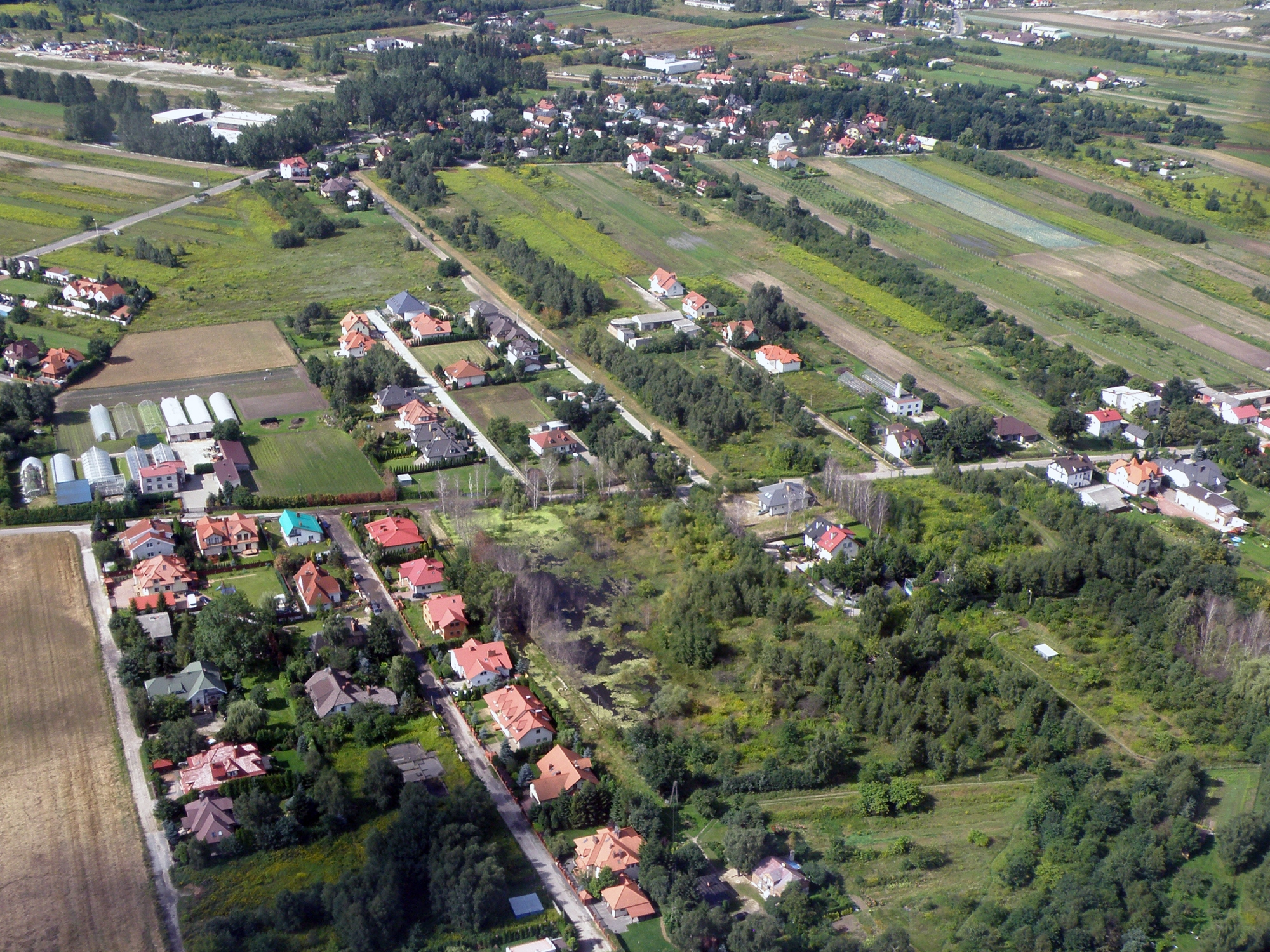
- Single-family housing at Trombity Street in 2011.
- Interactive map of Jeziorki Południowe
- Coordinates: 52.113848°N 21.001173°E
- Country: Poland
- Voivodeship: Masovian
- City and county: Warsaw
- District: Ursynów
- Administrative neighbourhood: Etap; Jeziorki
- Time zone: UTC+1 (CET)
  - Summer (DST): UTC+2 (CEST)
- Area code: +48 22

Jeziorki Południowe (Polish: [jɛˈʑɔr.ki pɔ.wudˈɲɔ.vɛ]; lit. 'South Jeziorki') is a neighbourhood, and a City Information System area, in Warsaw, Poland, within the Ursynów district, and the administrative neighbourhoods of Etap and Jeziorki. It is a residential area with low-rise single-family housing.

The village of Jeziorki was founded in the 15th century, via separation from the village of Gramnica, which no longer exists. In 1951, it was incorporated into the city of Warsaw.

== Etymology ==
The name Jeziorki refers to numerous lakes and ponds located within its boundaries, and can be loosely translated from Polish as the Little Lakes.

== History ==
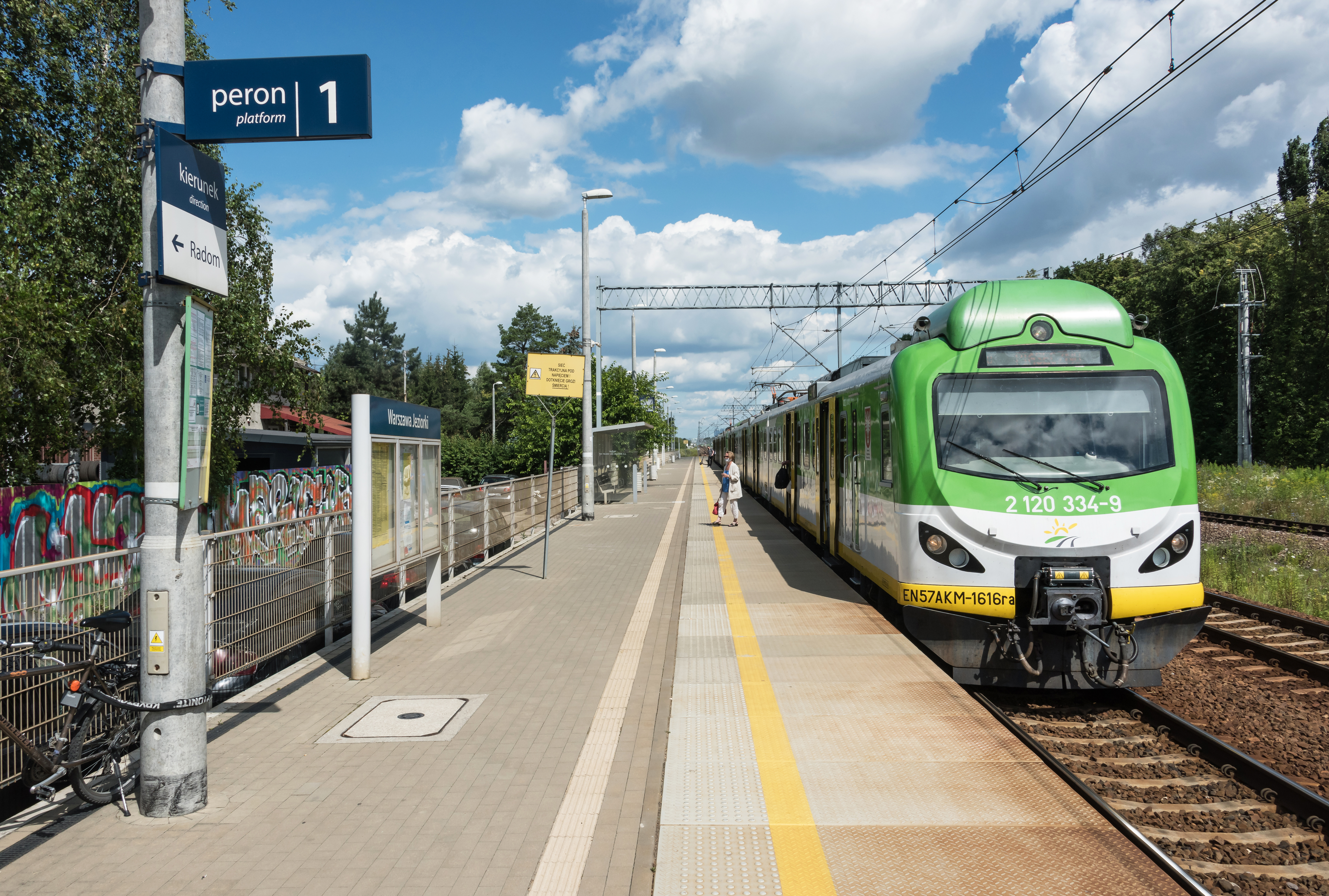
The Warszawa Jeziorki railway station, opened in 1962.

The village of Jeziorki was founded in the 15th century, via separation from the village of Gramnica, which no longer exists. In the 16th century, it was owned by the Jeziorkowski family of the Radwan heraldic clan. In 1528, together with the surrounding farmland, its estate had an area of 50 ha. In 1602, it was part of the Catholic parish based in Raszyn.

The village was destroyed by Swedish forces during the Second Northern War, a conflict between the Swedish Empire and Polish–Lithuanian Commonwealth, sometime between 1655 and 1656. In the second half of the 17th century, a portion of the village, with an area of 9 ha, was bought by Warsaw canon Czyżewski, who then incorporated it into his land estate of Dawidy. In 1729, Jeziorki had 10 households.

At the beginning of the 19th century, German settlers began moving into the village, which was then divided into two parts: Jeziorki Polskie (Polish Jeziorki) in the north, with Polish population, and Jeziorki Niemieckie (German Jeziorki) in the south, inhabited by Germans, later known as Nowe Jeziorki (New Jeziorski). In 1827, the latter had 110 residents in 10 households. In 1905, Jeziorki Niemieckie had 82 inhabitants in 12 households, and in 1921, it had 80 inhabitants and the same number of households. In 1905, Jeziorki Polskie had a population of 209 people in 13 households, and in 1921, 194 people in 19 households.

In 1936, the Warszawa Jeziorki railway station was opened at the current crossing of Karczunkowska Street and Gogolińska Street. Currently, it is operated by the Polish State Railways, as part of the railway line no. 8, between Warsaw West and Kraków Main stations.

On 14 May 1951, the area was incorporated into the city of Warsaw.

In 1996, the area became part of the administrative neighbourhood of Jeziorki, established as a subdivision of the municipality of Warsaw-Ursynów. It continued to exist following the restructurisation of the municipality into the Ursynów district in 2002, and its status was reconfirmed in 2013. In 1998, the district of Ursynów was subdivided into the areas of the City Information System, with Jeziorki Południowe becoming one of them.

In 1996, the administrative neighbourhoods of Jeziorki and Etap, were established as two subdivisions of the municipality of Warsaw-Ursynów. Both neighbourhoods continued to exist following the restructuring of the municipality into the Ursynów district in 2002. Their status was reconfirmed in 2013. The neighbourhood of Jeziorki has an area of 816 ha, and encompasses area between Warsaw Metro branch line, and in a line west from its crossing with Karnawał Street, Czempińska Street, Farbiarska Street, Klarnecistów Street, Sarabandy Street, Karczunkowska Street, Puławska Street, and the boundaries of the district of Ursynów. The neighbourhood of Etap has an area of 9 ha, and is an enclave surrounded by Jeziorki. It is located between Dawidowska Street (also including a building adjusted to its northeastern side), Karczunkowska Street, and the tracks of the railway line no. 8.

In 1998, the district of Ursynów was subdivided into the areas of the City Information System, with neighbourhoods of Jeziorki and Etap together being encompassed within areas of Jeziorki Północne (North Jeziorki), and Jeziorki Południowe (South Jeziorki). They are separated by Baletowa Street.

Between 2015 and 2023, St. Sophia of Holy Wisdom Church, belonging to the Polish Orthodox denomination, was built at 568 Puławska Street. It became the first Orthodox church to be constructed in Warsaw, in over 100 years.

== Overview ==
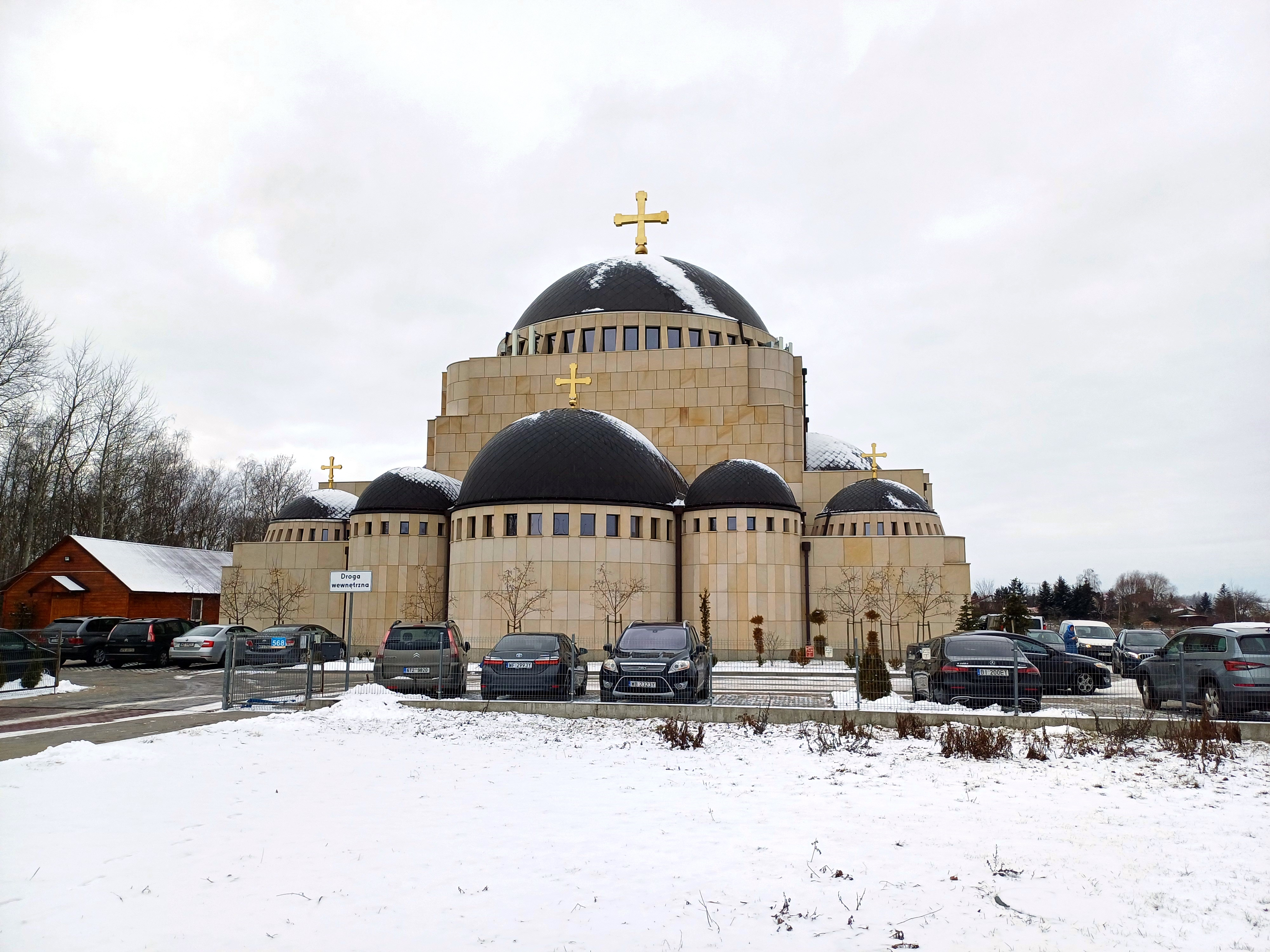
The St. Sophia of Holy Wisdom Church in 2025.

Jeziorki is a low-rise single-family residential area with detached houses. It also has farmlands. The area consists several smaller neighbourhoods, including Dawidy Zwykłe, Dawidy Poduchowne, Karczunek, Jeziorki Polskie, Nowe Jeziorki, and Zgorzała nad Jeziorem.

The area includes the Warszawa Jeziorki at the corner of Karczunkowska Street and Gogolińska Street, operated by the Polish State Railways, as part of the railway line no. 8, between Warsaw West and Kraków Main stations. The neighbourhood also has the St. Sophia of Holy Wisdom Church, which belongs to the Polish Orthodox denomination, placed at 568 Puławska Street.

The neighbourhood also features several ponds, including: Czyste, Nowe Ługi, Wąsal, and Zgorzała, as well as two artificial waterways Grabów Canal, and Jeziorki Ditch.

== Boundaries ==
Jeziorki Południowe is a City Information System area, located in the south-western portion of the Ursynów district. Its boundaries are approximately determined by Baletowa Street to the north; Farbiarska Street, Kobzy Street, Klarnecistów Street, Sarabandy Street, Karczunskowska Street, and Puławska Street; and the boundaries of the district. The neighbourhood borders Jeziorki Północne to the north, Pyry to the northeast, and Dąbrówka to the east. Their southern and western boundary forms the border of the city, with the municipality of Lesznowola in Piaseczno County, and the municipality of Raszyn in Pruszków County Additionally, Jeziorki Południowe is divided between two administrative neighbourhoods, Etap, and Jeziorki.
