= Jeziorki =

Neighbourhood in Warsaw, Poland

- Administrative neighbourhood
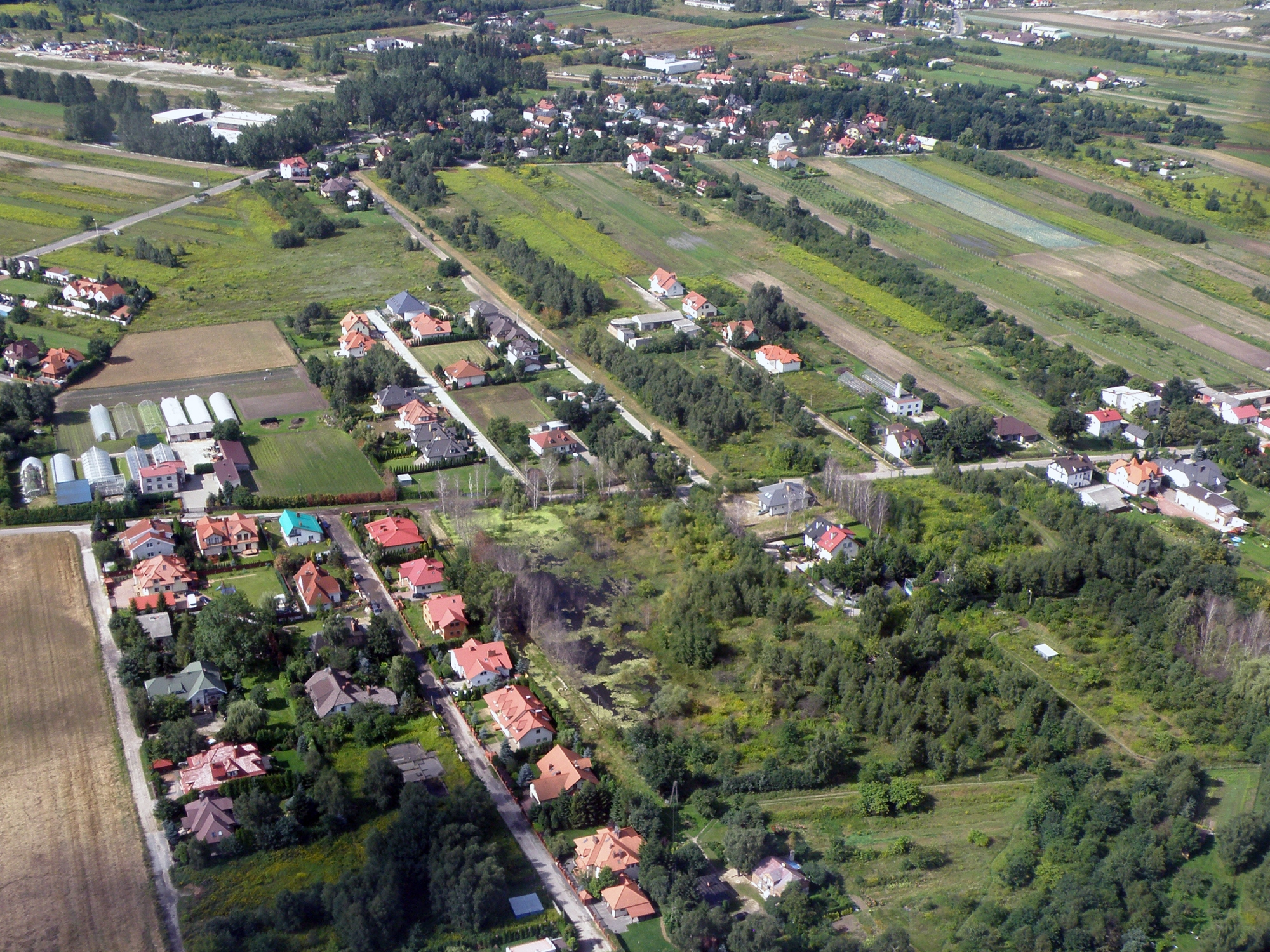
- Single-family housing in Jeziorki in 2011

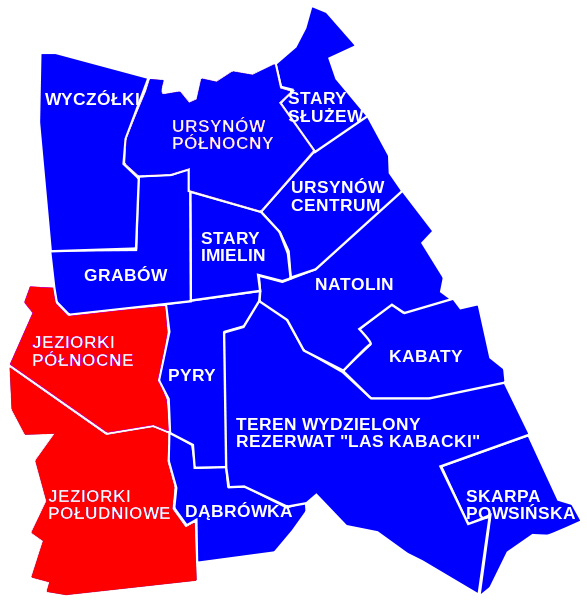
- Map of the district of Ursynów, with the location of the City Information System areas of Jeziorki Północne and Jeziorki Południowe, which encompass the neighbourhood of Jeziorki.
- Coordinates: 52°07′10″N 21°00′30″E
- Country: Poland
- Voivodeship: Masovian
- City and county: Warsaw
- District: Ursynów
- City Information System areas: Jeziorki Północne; Jeziorki Południowe

Area
  - Total: 8.16 km^{2} (3.15 sq mi)
- (Note: 8.16 km² is an area of the administrative neighbourhood of Jeziorki. This excludes the administrative neighbourhood of Etap, with an area of 0.09 km², which is an enclave within Jeziorki. Together, both neighbourhoods are encompassed within two City Information System areas: Jeziorki Północne, and Jeziorki Południowe. When combined their area is 8.25 km².)
- Time zone: UTC+1 (CET)
  - Summer (DST): UTC+2 (CEST)
- Area code: +48 22

Jeziorki (Polish: [jɛˈʑɔr.ki]) is an administrative neighbourhood in Warsaw, Poland, within the Ursynów district. It is encompassed within two areas of the City Information System, Jeziorki Północne (North Jeziorki) and Jeziorki Południowe (South Jeziorki). The neighbourhood is a residential area of low-rise single-family housing. The village of Jeziorki was founded in the 15th century, via separation from the village of Gramnica, which no longer exists. In 1951, it was incorporated into the city of Warsaw.

== Etymology ==
The name Jeziorki refers to numerous lakes and ponds located within its boundaries, and can be loosely translated from Polish as the Little Lakes.

== History ==
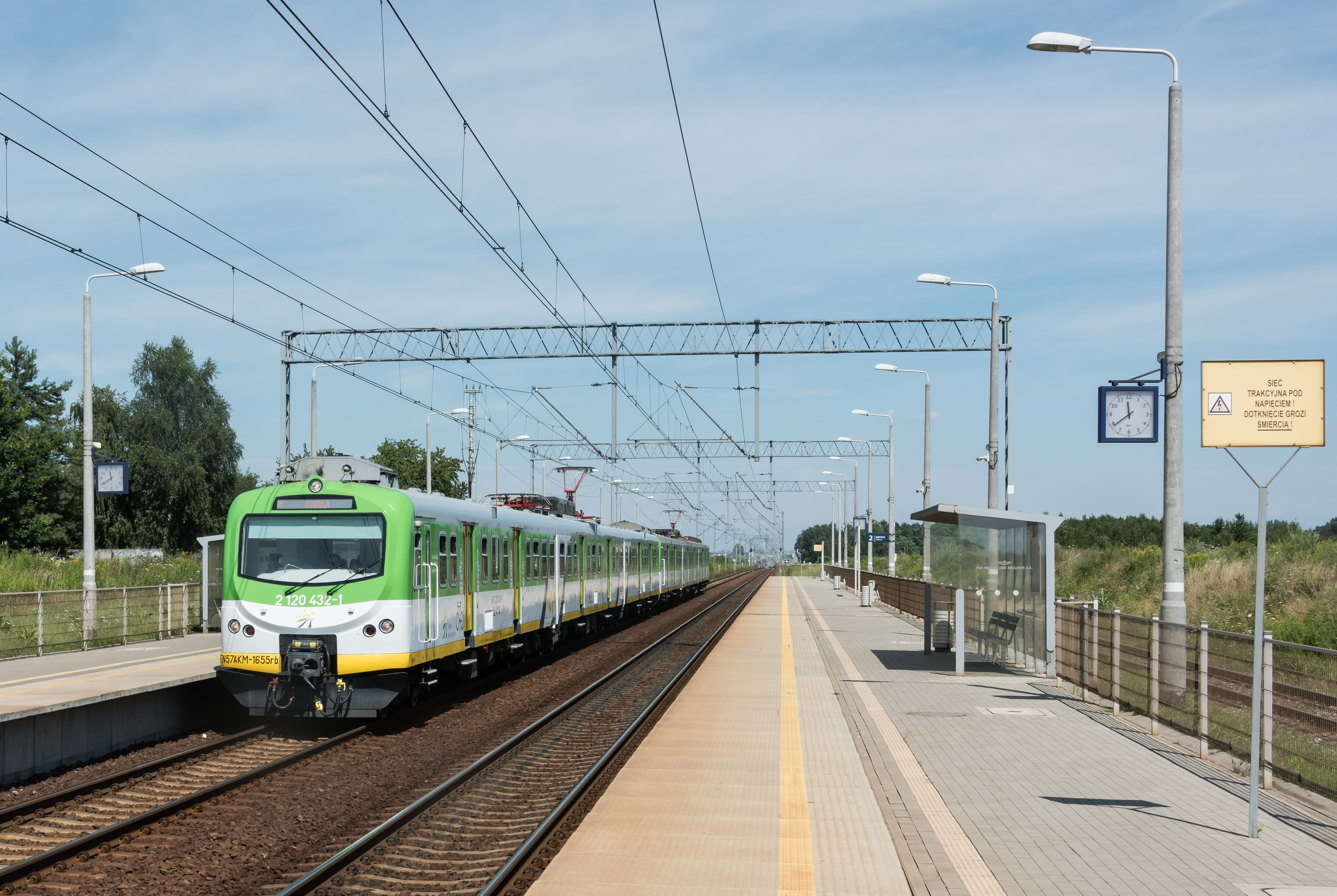
The Warszawa Dawidy railway station, opened in 1936.

The village of Jeziorki was founded in the 15th century, via separation from the village of Gramnica, which no longer exists. In the 16th century, it was owned by the Jeziorkowski family of the Radwan heraldic clan. In 1528, together with the surrounding farmland, its estate had an area of 50 ha. In 1602, it was part of the Catholic parish based in Raszyn.

The village was destroyed in 1656 by Swedish forces during the Second Northern War. In the second half of the 17th century, a portion of the village, with an area of 9 ha, was bought by Warsaw canon Czyżewski, who then incorporated it into his land estate of Dawidy. In 1729, Jeziorki had 10 households.

At the beginning of the 19th century, German settlers began moving into the village, which was then divided into two parts: Jeziorki Polskie (Polish Jeziorki) in the north, with Polish population, and Jeziorki Niemieckie (German Jeziorki) in the south, inhabited by Germans, later known as Nowe Jeziorki (New Jeziorski). In 1827, the latter had 110 residents in 10 households.

In 1864, German settlers had also founded the village of Ludwinów, located to the north of Jeziorki, in the area of current Ludwinowska Street.

In 1905, Jeziorki Niemieckie had 82 inhabitants in 12 households, and in 1921, it had 80 inhabitants and the same number of households. In 1905, Jeziorki Polskie had a population of 209 people in 13 households, and in 1921, 194 people in 19 households.

In 1936, the Warszawa Jeziorki railway station was opened at the current crossing of Karczunkowska Street and Gogolińska Street. In 1962, the Warszawa Dawidy railway station, was also opened to the north, at Baletowa Street. Both are operated to the present day by the Polish State Railways, and are part of the railway line no. 8, between Warsaw West and Kraków Main stations.

On 24 March 1946, the Pyry Cemetery was opened at Łagiewnicka Street, operated by the Sts. Apostles Peter and Paul Church, located in the nearby Pyry.

On 14 May 1951, the area including Jeziorki and Ludwinów was incorporated into the city of Warsaw.

In 1996, the administrative neighbourhoods of Jeziorki and Etap, were established as two subdivisions of the municipality of Warsaw-Ursynów. Both neighbourhoods continued to exist following the restructuring of the municipality into the Ursynów district in 2002. Their status was reconfirmed in 2013. The neighbourhood of Jeziorki has an area of 816 ha, and encompasses area between Warsaw Metro branch line, and in a line west from its crossing with Karnawał Street, Czempińska Street, Farbiarska Street, Klarnecistów Street, Sarabandy Street, Karczunkowska Street, Puławska Street, and the boundaries of the district of Ursynów. The neighbourhood of Etap has an area of 9 ha, and is an enclave surrounded by Jeziorki. It is located between Dawidowska Street (also including a building adjusted to its northeastern side), Karczunkowska Street, and the tracks of the railway line no. 8.

In 1998, the district of Ursynów was subdivided into the areas of the City Information System, with neighbourhoods of Jeziorki and Etap together being encompassed within areas of Jeziorki Północne (North Jeziorki), and Jeziorki Południowe (South Jeziorki). They are separated by Baletowa Street.

Between 2006 and 2010, the Presbyterian Warsaw Korean Church was built at 63D Farbiarska Street. Between 2015 and 2023, the St. Sophia of Holy Wisdom Church, which belongs to the Polish Orthodox denomination, was built at 568 Puławska Street. It became the first Orthodox church to be constructed in Warsaw in over 100 years.

== Characteristics ==
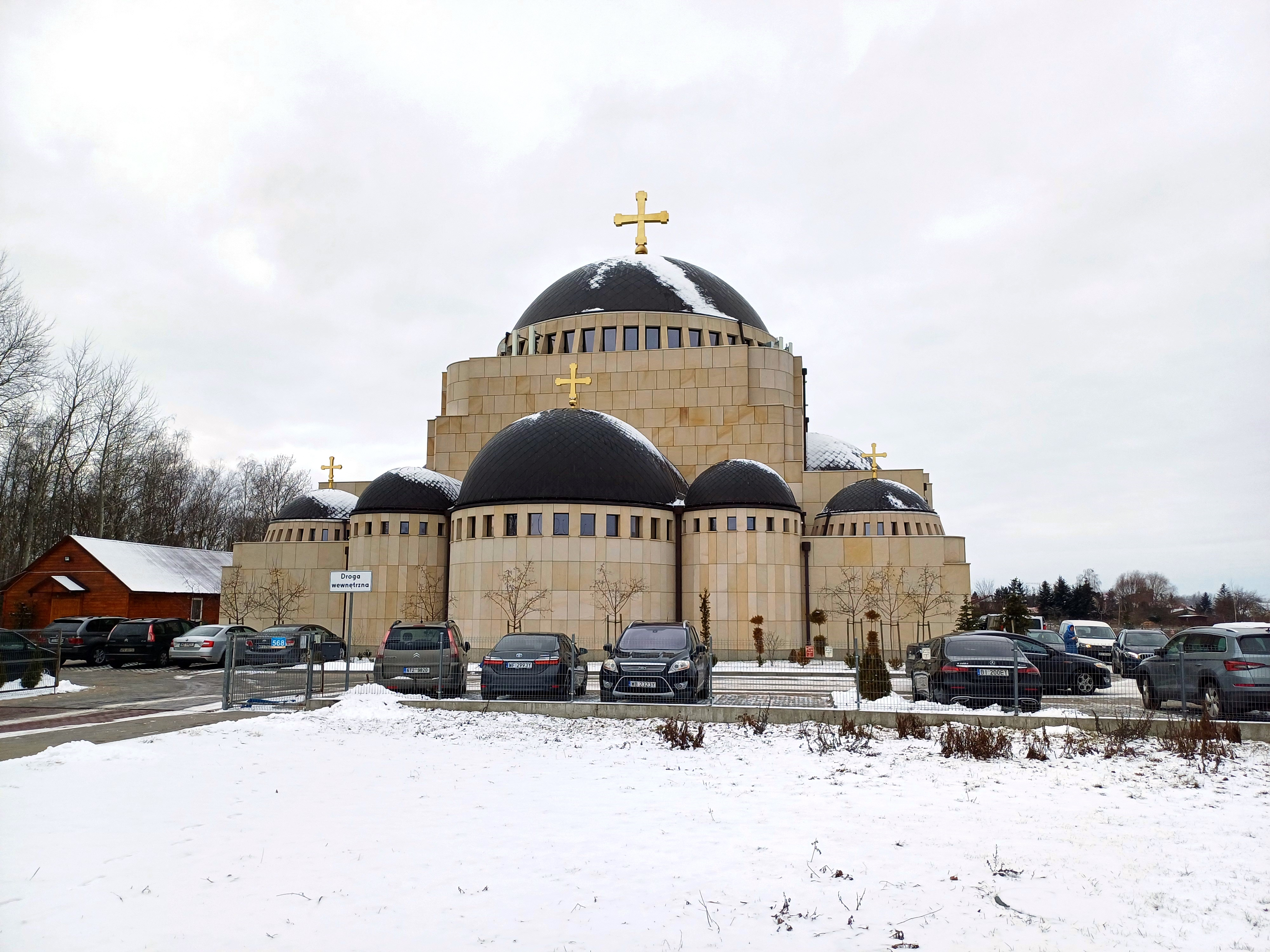
The St. Sophia of Holy Wisdom Church in 2025.

Jeziorki is a low-rise single-family residential area with detached and semi-detached houses. It also has farmlands. The area consists several smaller neighbourhoods, including Dawidy Zwykłe, Dawidy Poduchowne, Karczunek, Ludwinów, Jeziorki Polskie, Nowe Jeziorki, and Zgorzała nad Jeziorem.

The neighbourhood also includes two railway stations, Warszawa Jeziorki at the corner of Karczunkowska Street and Gogolińska Street, and Warszawa Dawidy at Baletowa Street. Both are operated by the Polish State Railways, and are part of the railway line no. 8, between Warsaw West and Kraków Main stations.

The St. Sophia of Holy Wisdom Church, which belongs to the Polish Orthodox denomination, is placed at 568 Puławska Street. Jeziorki also includes Presbyterian Warsaw Korean Church at 63D Farbiarska Street, and the Pyry Cemetery at Łagiewnicka Street, operated by the Sts. Apostles Peter and Paul Church in the nearby Pyry.

Jeziorki Północne also has several ponds, including: Czyste, Kądziołeczka, Krosno, Łużek, Nowe Ługi, Szyja, Wąsal, Zgorzała, as well as two artificial waterways Grabów Canal, and Jeziorki Ditch.

== Location and boundaries ==
Jeziorki is an administrative neighbourhood in Warsaw, Poland, located within the southwestern portion of the district of Ursynów. It has an area of 816 ha, and encompasses territory between Warsaw Metro railway branch line, Karnawał Street, Czempińska Street, Farbiarska Street, Klarnecistów Street, Sarabandy Street, Karczunkowska Street, Puławska Street, and the boundaries of the district. The neighbourhood of Etap, with an area of 9 ha, forms an enclave inside of Jeziorki. It is located between Dawidowska Street (also including buildings adjusted to its northeastern side), Karczunkowska Street, and the tracks of the railway line no. 8.

Administrative neighbourhoods of Jelonki and Etap are together encompassed within the City Information System areas of Jeziorki Północne (North Jeziorki), and Jeziorki Południowe (South Jeziorki). They are separated by Baletowa Street. They border Dąbrówka, Grabów, and Pyry. Their southern and western boundary forms the border of the city, with the municipality of Lesznowola in Piaseczno County, and the municipality of Raszyn in Pruszków County.
