= Dawidy Zwykłe =

Neighbourhood of Warsaw, Poland

- Neighbourhood
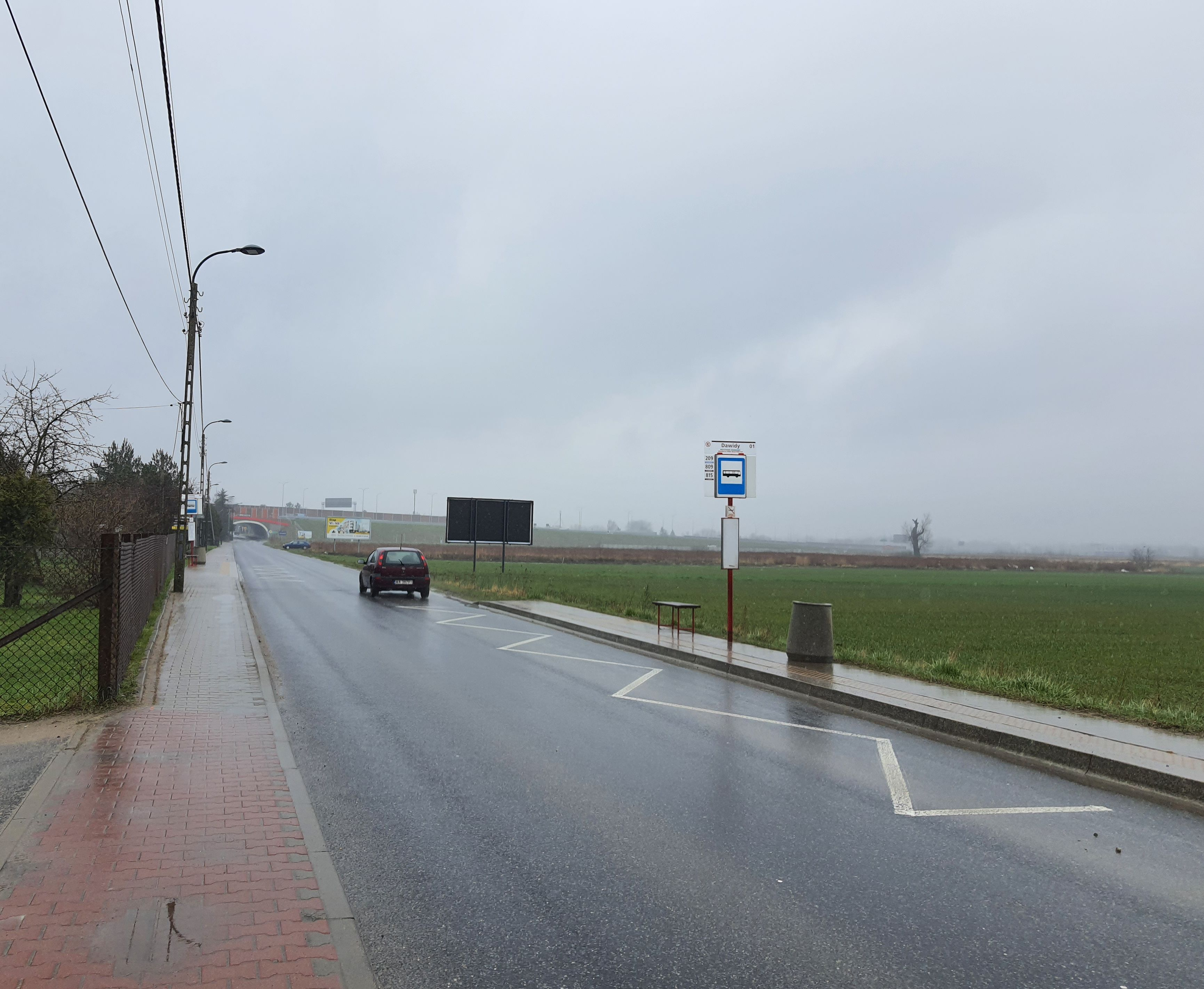
- A bus stop on Baletowa Street in Dawidy Zwykłe, in 2023.
- Interactive map of Dawidy Zwykłe
- Coordinates: 52.130915°N 20.984351°E
- Country: Poland
- Voivodeship: Masovian
- City and county: Warsaw
- District: Ursynów
- City Information System areas: Jeziorki Północne; Jeziorki Południowe
- Administrative neighbourhood: Jeziorki
- Time zone: UTC+1 (CET)
  - Summer (DST): UTC+2 (CEST)
- Area code: +48 22

Dawidy Zwykłe Polish: [daˈvi.dɘ̟ ˈzvɘ̟.kwɛ]) is a neighbourhood in Warsaw, Poland, within the Ursynów district, and the administrative neighbourhood of Jeziorki. It belongs to the administrative neighbourhood of Jeziorki, and is divided between City Information System areas of Jeziorki Północne and Jeziorki Południowe. It is a residential area with low-rise single-family housing.

== History ==
In the second half of the 17th century, a portion of 9 ha of farmland of the nearby village of Jeziorki, was bought by Warsaw canon Czyżewski, who then incorporated it into his land estate of Dawidy.

On 14 May 1951, a portion of Dawidy was incorporated into the city of Warsaw, forming neighbourhoods of Dawidy Zwykłe in the north, and Dawidy Poduchowne in the south.

== Overview ==
Dawidy Zwykłe is a low-rise residential area with detached houses, with the additional presence of farmland. It is placed in the area of Baletowa Street, near the city boundary.
