= Nowe Jeziorki =

Neighbourhood of Warsaw, Poland

- Neighbourhood
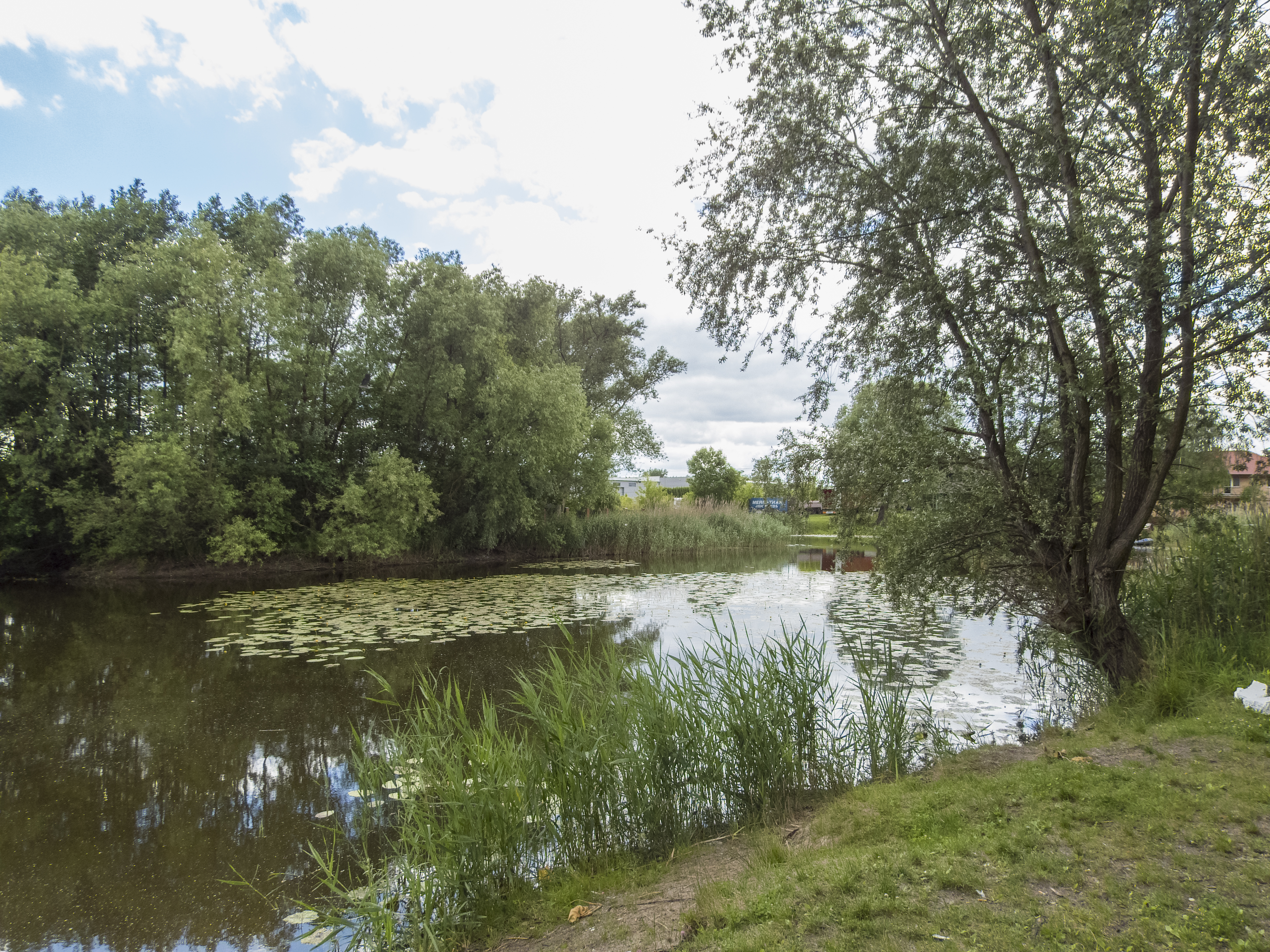
- The Czyste Pond in Nowe Jeziorki in 2020.
- Interactive map of Nowe Jeziorki
- Coordinates: 52°07′10″N 21°00′30″E
- Country: Poland
- Voivodeship: Masovian
- City and county: Warsaw
- District: Ursynów
- City Information System areas: Jeziorki Północne; Jeziorki Południowe
- Administrative neighbourhood: Jeziorki
- Time zone: UTC+1 (CET)
  - Summer (DST): UTC+2 (CEST)
- Area code: +48 22

Nowe Jeziorki (Polish: [ˈnɔ.vɛ jɛˈʑɔr.ki]; lit. 'New Jeziorki') is a neighbourhood in Warsaw, Poland, within the Ursynów district, and the administrative neighbourhood of Jeziorki. It belongs to the administrative neighbourhood of Jeziorki, and is divided between City Information System areas of Jeziorki Północne and Jeziorki Południowe. It is a residential area with low-rise single-family housing.

The village of Jeziorki was founded in the 15th century, via separation from the village of Gramnica, which no longer exists. In 1951, it was incorporated into the city of Warsaw. In the 19th century, it was divided into two portions, with Jeziorki Polskie in the north, with Polish population, and Jeziorki Niemieckie, later known as Nowe Jeziorki, founded by German settlers.

== History ==
The village of Jeziorki was founded in the 15th century, via separation from the village of Gramnica, which no longer exists. In the 16th century, it was owned by the Jeziorkowski family of the Radwan heraldic clan. In 1528, together with the surrounding farmland, its estate had an area of 50 ha. In 1602, it was part of the Catholic parish based in Raszyn.

The village was destroyed by Swedish forces during the Second Northern War, a conflict between the Swedish Empire and Polish–Lithuanian Commonwealth, sometime between 1655 and 1656. In the second half of the 17th century, a portion of the village, with an area of 9 ha, was bought by Warsaw canon Czyżewski, who then incorporated it into his land estate of Dawidy. In 1729, Jeziorki had 10 households.

At the beginning of the 19th century, German settlers began moving into the village, which was then divided into two parts: Jeziorki Polskie (Polish Jeziorki) in the north, with Polish population, and Jeziorki Niemieckie (German Jeziorki) in the south, inhabited by Germans, later known as Nowe Jeziorki (New Jeziorski). In 1827, the latter had 110 residents in 10 households. In 1905, Jeziorki Niemieckie had 82 inhabitants in 12 households, and in 1921, it had 80 inhabitants and the same number of households.

On 14 May 1951, the area was incorporated into the city of Warsaw. In 1996, the area became part of the administrative neighbourhood of Jeziorki, established as a subdivision of the municipality of Warsaw-Ursynów. It continued to exist following the restructurisation of the municipality into the Ursynów district in 2002, and its status was reconfirmed in 2013.

== Overview ==
Nowe Jeziorki is a low-rise residential area with detached and semi-detached houses, with the additional presence of farmland. Nearby, are also present the ponds Czyste and Zagorzała.
