= Jeziorki Polskie =

Neighbourhood of Warsaw, Poland

- Neighbourhood
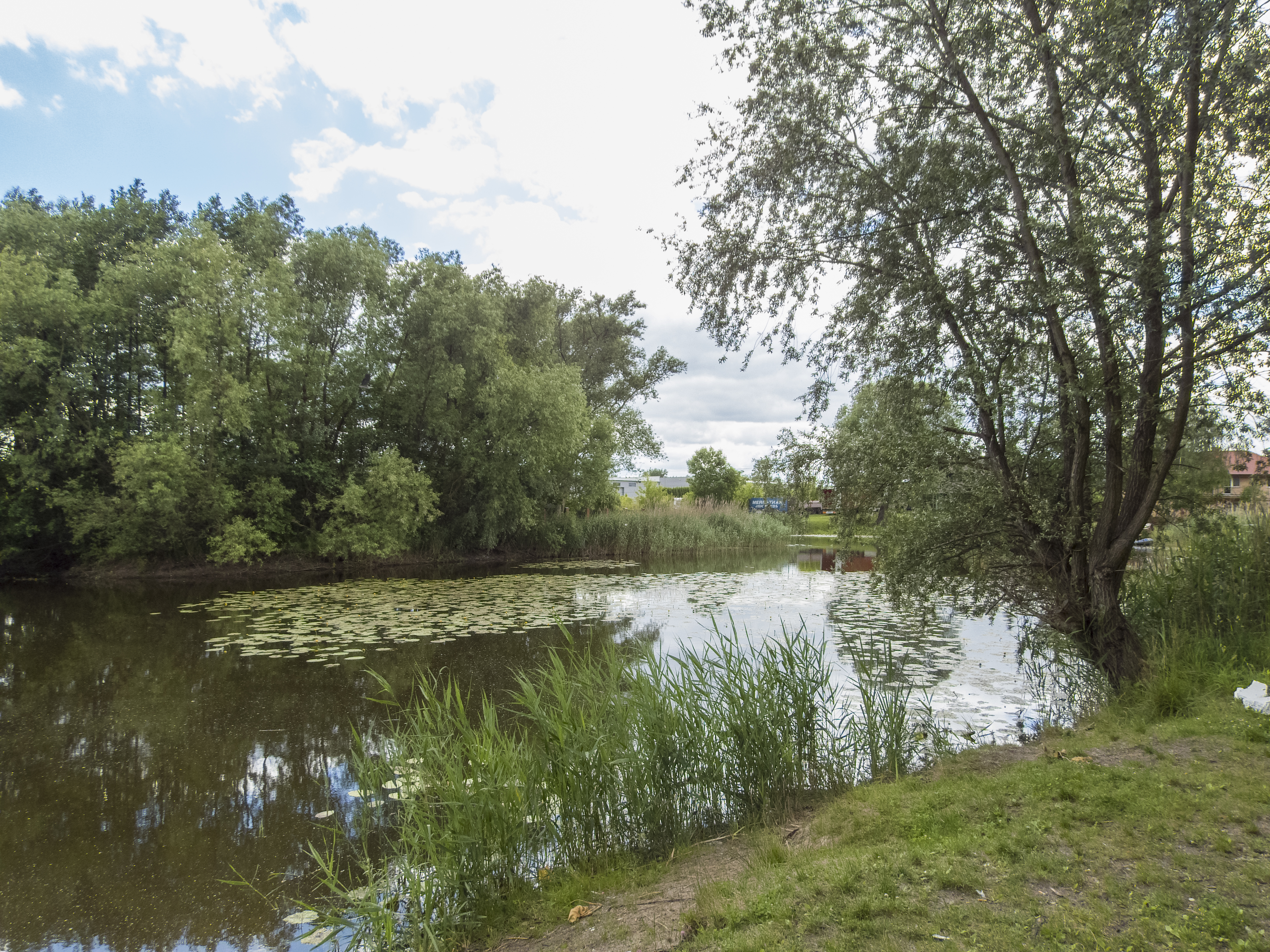
- Czyste Pond in Nowe Jeziorki in 2022.
- Interactive map of Jeziorki Polskie
- Coordinates: 52.124820°N 20.996829°E
- Country: Poland
- Voivodeship: Masovian
- City and county: Warsaw
- District: Ursynów
- City Information System areas: Jeziorki Północne; Jeziorki Południowe
- Administrative neighbourhood: Jeziorki
- Time zone: UTC+1 (CET)
  - Summer (DST): UTC+2 (CEST)
- Area code: +48 22

Jeziorki Polskie (Polish: [jɛˈʑɔr.ki ˈpɔl.skjɛ]; lit. 'Polish Jeziorki') is a neighbourhood, in Warsaw, Poland, within the Ursynów district. It belongs to the administrative neighbourhood of Jeziorki, and is divided between City Information System areas of Jeziorki Północne and Jeziorki Południowe. It is a residential area with low-rise single-family housing.

The village of Jeziorki was founded in the 15th century, via separation from the village of Gramnica, which no longer exists. In 1951, it was incorporated into the city of Warsaw. In the 19th century, it was divided into two portions, with Jeziorki Polskie in the north, with Polish population, and Jeziorki Niemieckie, later known as Nowe Jeziorki, founded by German settlers.

== History ==
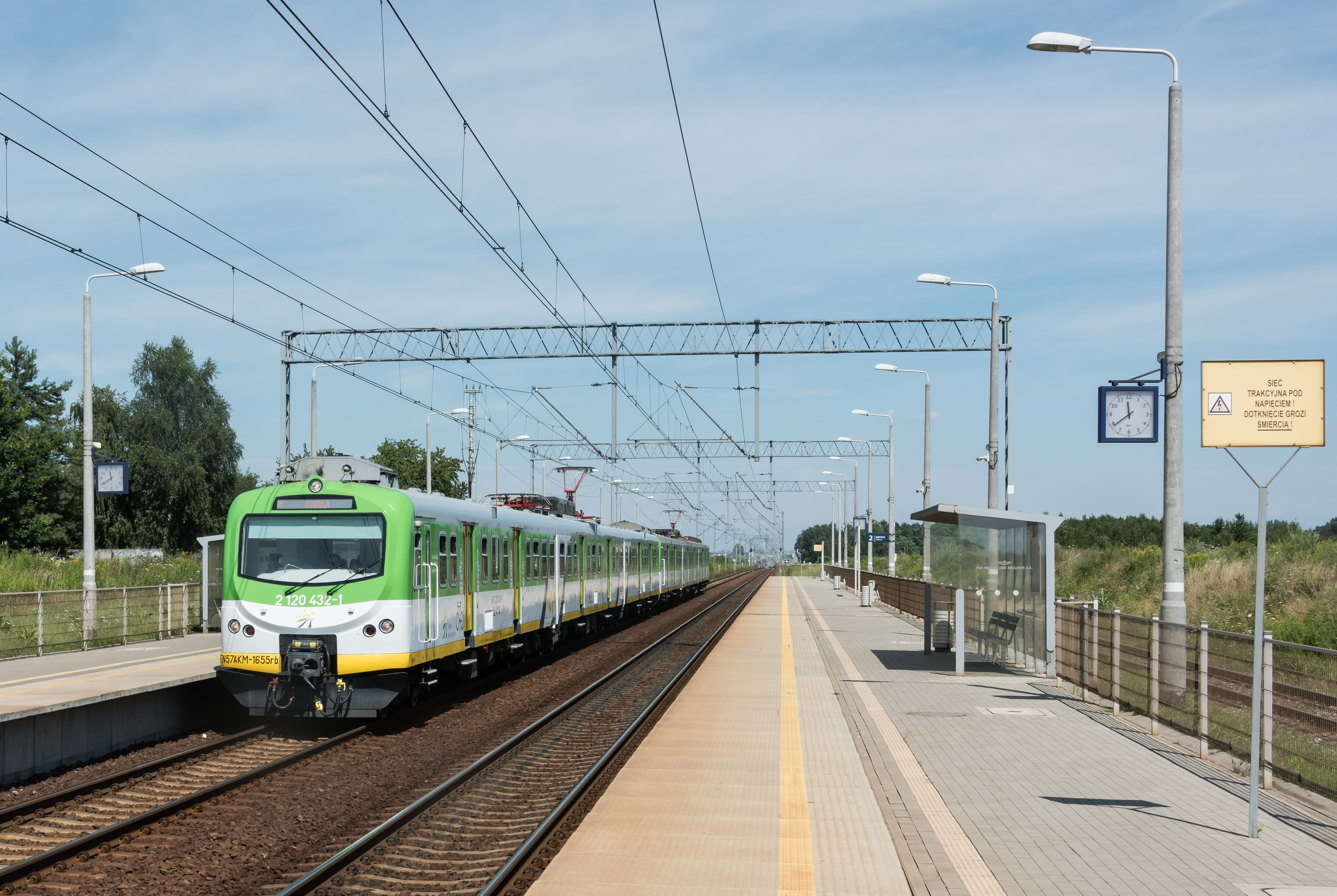
The Warszawa Dawidy railway station, founded in 1962.

The village of Jeziorki was founded in the 15th century, via separation from the village of Gramnica, which no longer exists. In the 16th century, it was owned by the Jeziorkowski family of the Radwan heraldic clan. In 1528, together with surrounding farmland, its estate had an area of 50 ha. In 1602, it was part of the Catholic parish based in Raszyn.

The village was destroyed by Swedish forces during the Second Northern War, a conflict between the Swedish Empire and Polish–Lithuanian Commonwealth, sometime between 1655 and 1656. In the second half of the 17th century, a portion of the village, with an area of 9 ha, was bought by Warsaw canon Czyżewski, who then incorporated it into his land estate of Dawidy. In 1729, Jeziorki had 10 households.

At the beginning of the 19th century, German settlers began moving into the village, which was then divided into two parts: Jeziorki Polskie (Polish Jeziorki) in the north, with Polish population, and Jeziorki Niemieckie (German Jeziorki) in the south, inhabited by Germans, later known as Nowe Jeziorki (New Jeziorski).

In 1905, Jeziorki Polskie had a population of 209 people in 13 households, and in 1921, 194 people in 19 households.

In 1962, the Warszawa Dawidy railway station, was opened at Baletowa Street. Currenlty, it isnoperated by the Polish State Railways, as part of the railway line no. 8, between Warsaw West and Kraków Main stations.

On 14 May 1951, Jeziorki Polskie was incorporated into the city of Warsaw.

In 1996, the area became part of the administrative neighbourhood of Jeziorki, established as a subdivision of the municipality of Warsaw-Ursynów. It continued to exist following the restructurisation of the municipality into the Ursynów district in 2002, and its status was reconfirmed in 2013.

In 1998, the district of Ursynów was subdivided into the areas of the City Information System, with Jeziorki Polskie becoming part of Jeziorki Północne.

== Overview ==
Jeziorki Polskie is a low-rise residential area with detached houses, with the additional presence of farmland. The neighbourhood is concentrated in the area around the intersection of Baletowa and Jeziorki Streets. It alsonincludes the Warszawa Dawidy at Baletowa Street, it is operated by the Polish State Railways, and are part of the railway line no. 8, between Warsaw West and Kraków Main stations. Additionally, the Zagorzała Lake is located to the south from the neighbourhood.
