= Dawidy Poduchowne =

Neighbourhood of Warsaw, Poland

- Neighbourhood
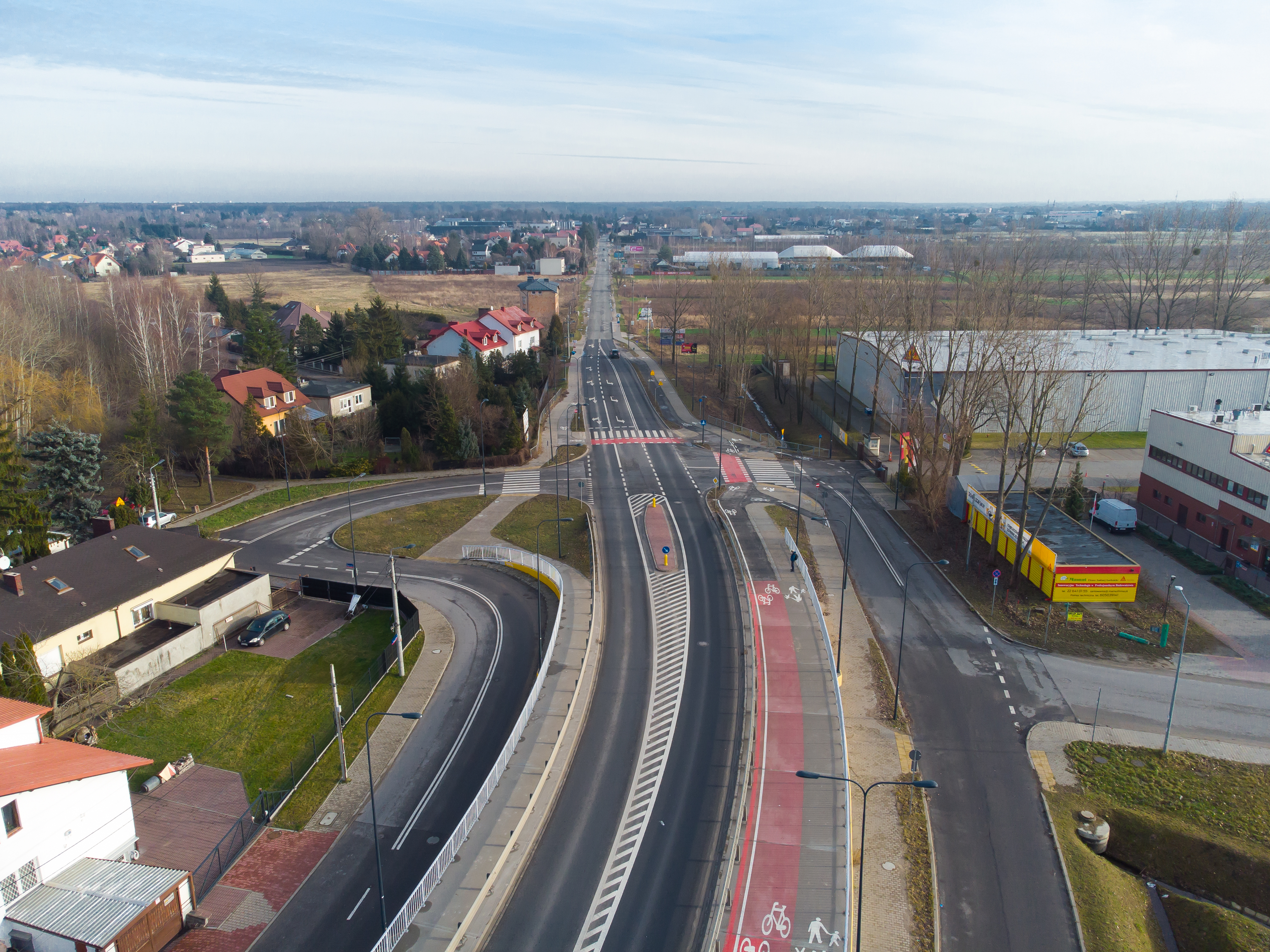
- Houses at Karczunkowska Street in 2023.
- Interactive map of Dawidy Poduchowne
- Coordinates: 52.112240°N 20.989715°E
- Country: Poland
- Voivodeship: Masovian
- City and county: Warsaw
- District: Ursynów
- City Information System areas: Jeziorki Północne
- Administrative neighbourhoods: Etap; Jeziorki
- Time zone: UTC+1 (CET)
  - Summer (DST): UTC+2 (CEST)
- Area code: +48 22

Dawidy Poduchowne (Polish: [daˈvi.dɘ̟ pɔ.duˈxɔv.nɛ]) is a neighbourhood in Warsaw, Poland, within the Ursynów district. It belongs to the administrative neighbourhoods of Etap and Jeziorki, and the City Information System area of Jeziorki Północne. It is a residential area with low-rise single-family housing. The neighbourhood includes the Warszawa Jeziorki railway station.

== History ==
In the second half of the 17th century, a portion of 9 ha of farmland of the nearby village of Jeziorki, was bought by Warsaw canon Czyżewski, who then incorporated it into his land estate of Dawidy.

In 1936, the Warszawa Jeziorki railway station was opened at the corner of Karczunkowska Street and Gogolińska Street, near Dawidy Poduchowne. Currently, it is operated by the Polish State Railways, as part of the railway line no. 8, between Warsaw West and Kraków Main stations.

On 14 May 1951, a portion of Dawidy was incorporated into the city of Warsaw, forming neighbourhoods of Dawidy Zwykłe in the north, and Dawidy Poduchowne in the south.

In 1996, the area became part of the administrative neighbourhoods of Etap and Jeziorki, as two subdivisions of the municipality of Warsaw-Ursynów. Both neighbourhoods continued to exist following the restructuring of the municipality into the Ursynów district in 2002. Their status was reconfirmed in 2013. Etap wad founded as enclave surrounded by Jeziorki, and located between Dawidowska Street (also including a building adjusted to its northeastern side), Karczunkowska Street, and the tracks of the railway line no. 8.

In 1998, the Ursynów district was divided the City Information System areas, with neighbourhood of Dawidy Poduchowne becoming part of Jeziorki Północne.

== Characteristics ==
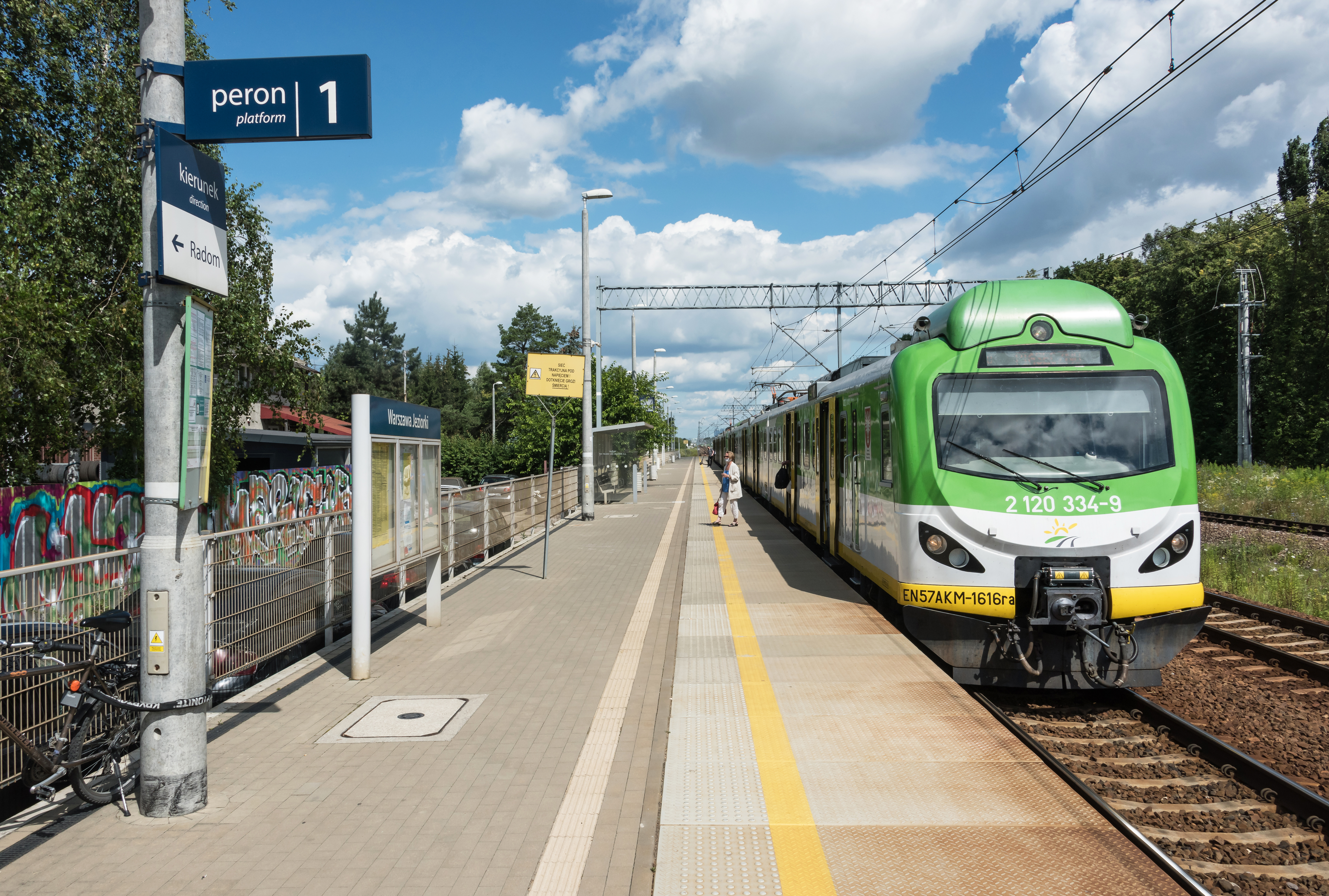
The Warszawa Jeziorki railway station in Dawidy Poduchowne.

Dawidy Poduchowne is a low-rise residential area with detached houses, with the additional presence of farmland. It is placed in the area of Karczunkowska, Poduchowna, and Dawidowska Streets. The neighbourhood is crossed by the railway tracks, and includes the Warszawa Jeziorki at the corner of Karczunkowska Street and Gogolińska Street, operated by the Polish State Railways, as part of the railway line no. 8, between Warsaw West and Kraków Main stations.

The neighbourhood is administered by the neighbourhoods of Etap Jeziorki, governed by locally elected councils. The prior has an area of 9 ha, and is an enclave surrounded by the later. It is located between Dawidowska Street (also including a building adjusted to its northeastern side), Karczunkowska Street, and the tracks of the railway line no. 8.
