= Jeziorki Północne =

Neighbourhood of Warsaw, Poland

- City Information System area (neighbourhood)
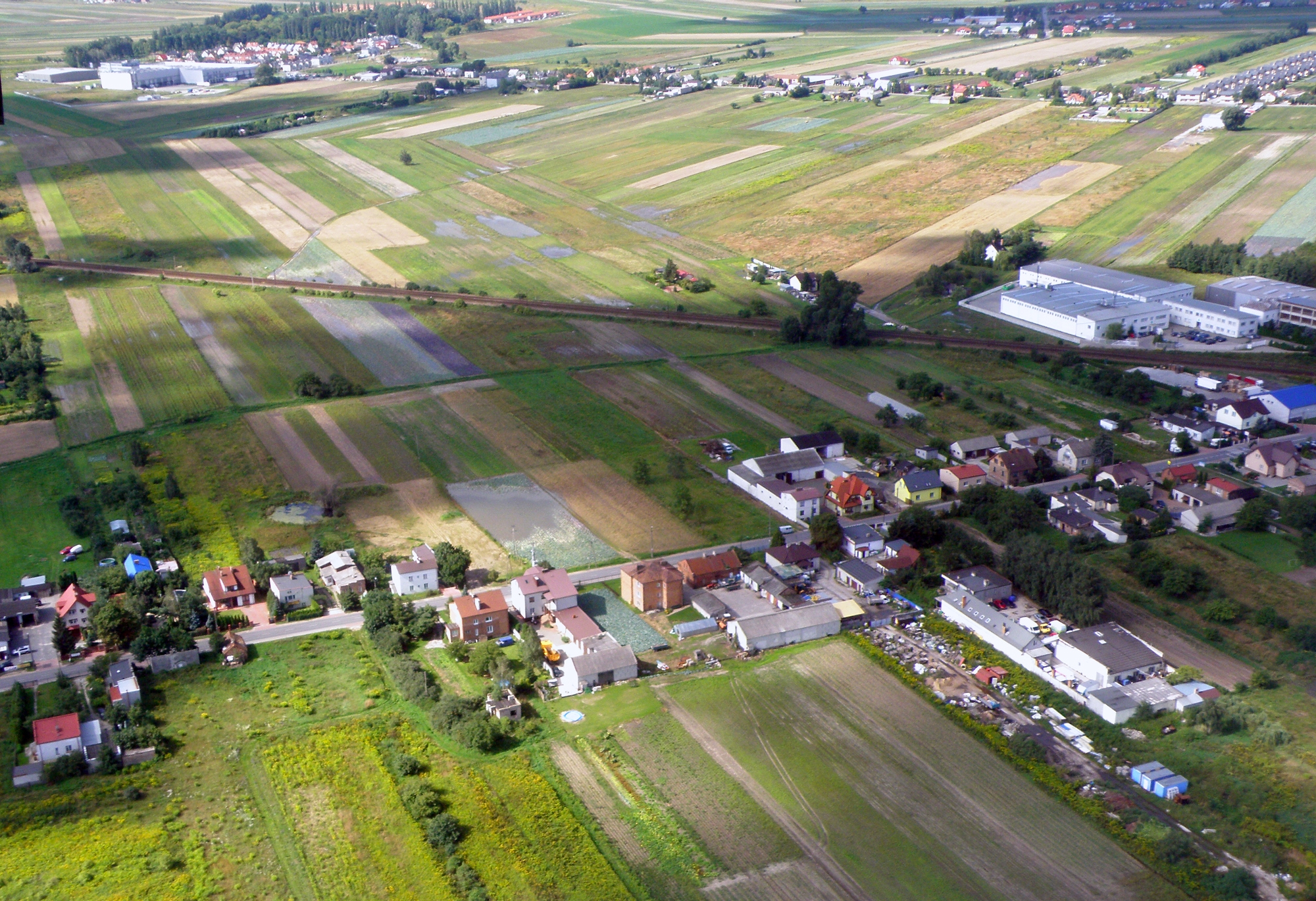
- Single-family housing alongside Baletowa Street in 2011.
- Interactive map of Jeziorki Północne
- Coordinates: 52.130779°N 21.002186°E
- Country: Poland
- Voivodeship: Masovian
- City and county: Warsaw
- District: Ursynów
- Administrative neighbourhood: Jeziorki
- Time zone: UTC+1 (CET)
  - Summer (DST): UTC+2 (CEST)
- Area code: +48 22

Jeziorki Północne (Polish: [jɛˈʑɔr.ki puwˈnɔt͡s.nɛ]; lit. 'North Jeziorki') is a neighbourhood, and a City Information System area, in Warsaw, Poland, within the Ursynów district, and the administrative neighbourhood of Jeziorki. It is a residential area with low-rise single-family housing.

The village of Jeziorki was founded in the 15th century, via separation from the village of Gramnica, which no longer exists. In the 19th century, the village of Ludwinów was also established in the area. In 1951, they were incorporated into the city of Warsaw.

== Etymology ==
The name Jeziorki refers to numerous lakes and ponds located within its boundaries, and can be loosely translated from Polish as the Little Lakes.

== History ==
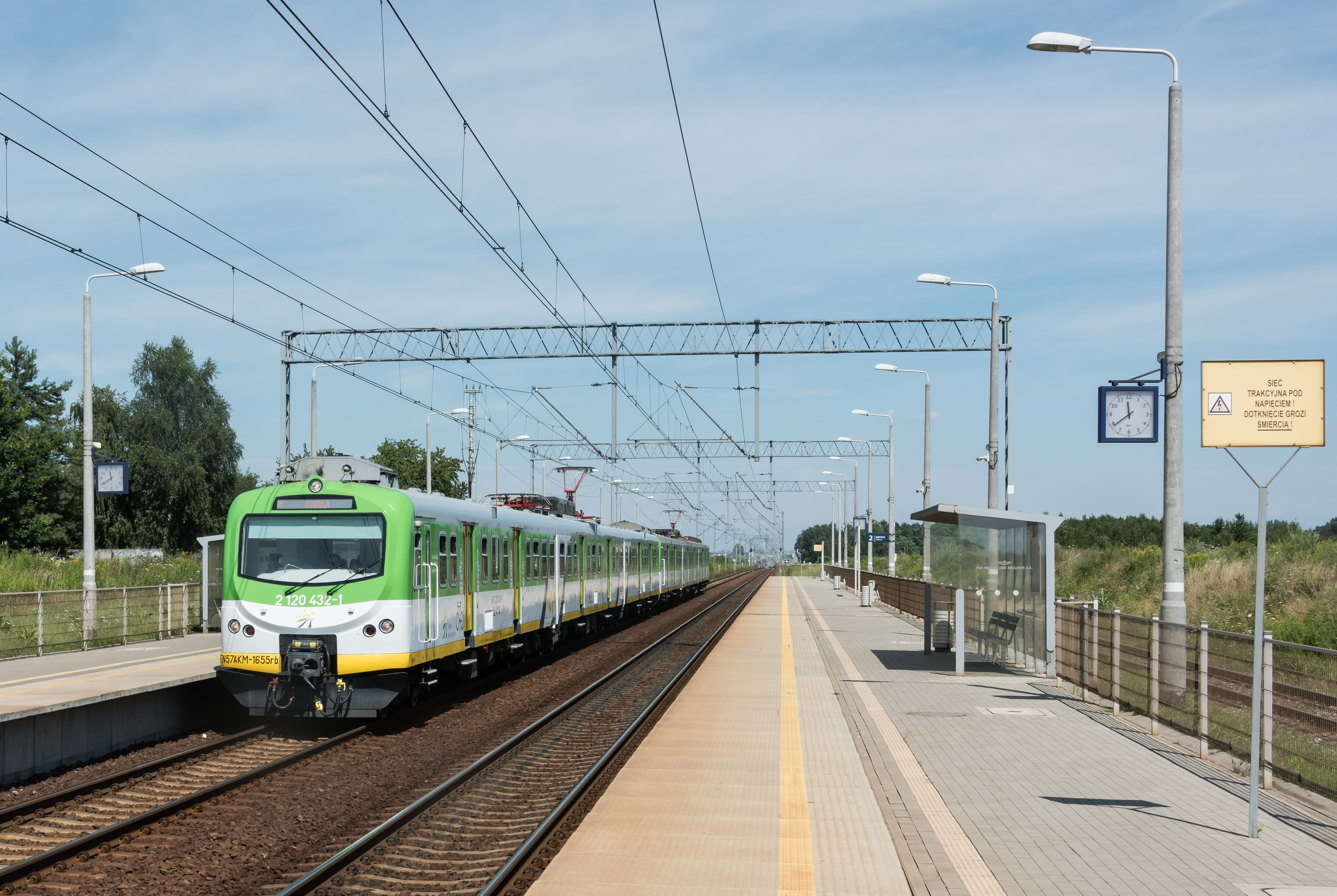
The Warszawa Dawidy railway station, founded in 1962.

The village of Jeziorki was founded in the 15th century, via separation from the village of Gramnica, which no longer exists. In the 16th century, it was owned by the Jeziorkowski family of the Radwan heraldic clan. In 1528, together with the surrounding farmland, its estate had an area of 50 ha. In 1602, it was part of the Catholic parish based in Raszyn.

The village was destroyed by Swedish forces during the Second Northern War, a conflict between the Swedish Empire and Polish–Lithuanian Commonwealth, sometime between 1655 and 1656. In the second half of the 17th century, a portion of the village, with an area of 9 ha, was bought by Warsaw canon Czyżewski, who then incorporated it into his land estate of Dawidy. In 1729, Jeziorki had 10 households.

At the beginning of the 19th century, German settlers began moving into the village, which was then divided into two parts: Jeziorki Polskie (Polish Jeziorki) in the north, with Polish population, and Jeziorki Niemieckie (German Jeziorki) in the south, inhabited by Germans, later known as Nowe Jeziorki (New Jeziorski). In 1827, the latter had 110 residents in 10 households.

In 1864, German settlers had also founded the village of Ludwinów, located to the north of Jeziorki, in the area of current Ludwinowska Street.

In 1905, Jeziorki Niemieckie had 82 inhabitants in 12 households, and in 1921, it had 80 inhabitants and the same number of households. In 1905, Jeziorki Polskie had a population of 209 people in 13 households, and in 1921, 194 people in 19 households.

On 24 March 1946, the Pyry Cemetery was opened at Łagiewnicka Street, operated by the Sts. Apostles Peter and Paul Church, located in the nearby Pyry.

On 14 May 1951, the area was incorporated into the city of Warsaw.

In 1962, the Warszawa Dawidy railway station was at Baletowa Street. Currently, it is operated by the Polish State Railways, as part of the railway line no. 8, between Warsaw West and Kraków Main stations.

In 1996, the area became part of the administrative neighbourhood of Jeziorki, established as a subdivision of the municipality of Warsaw-Ursynów. It continued to exist following the restructurisation of the municipality into the Ursynów district in 2002, and its status was reconfirmed in 2013.

In 1998, the district of Ursynów was subdivided into the areas of the City Information System, with Jeziorki Północne becoming one of them.

Between 2006 and 2010, the Presbyterian Warsaw Korean Church was built at 63D Farbiarska Street.

== Overview ==
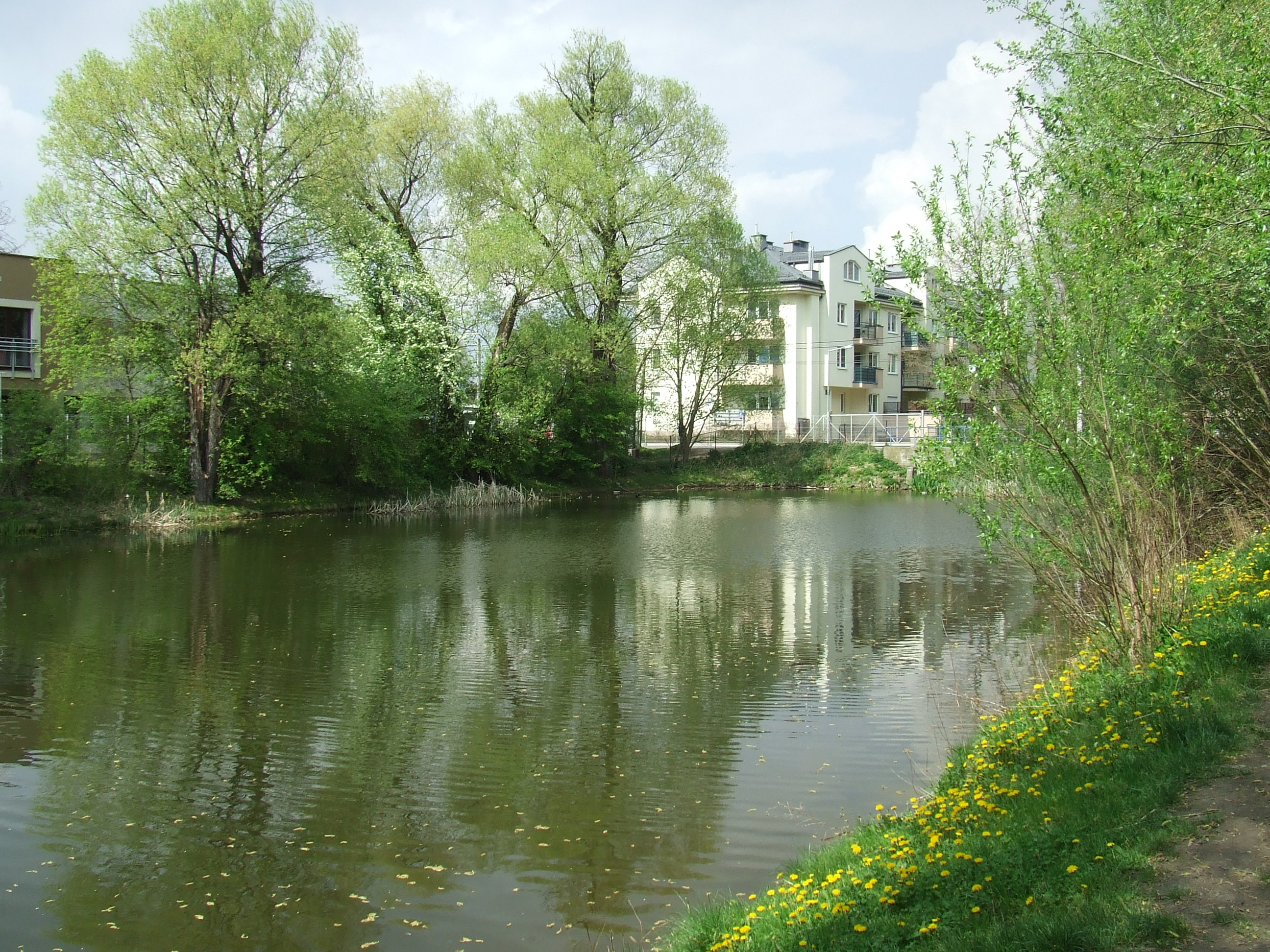
The Krosno Pond in Jeziorki Północne.

Jeziorki Północne is a low-rise residential area with detached and semi-detached houses, with the additional presence of farmland. It includes the neighbourhoods of Jeziorki Polskie, Ludwinów, and Nowe Jeziorki.

The area includes the Warszawa Dawidy at Baletowa Street, operated by the Polish State Railways, and are part of the railway line no. 8, between stations Warszawa Zachodnia and Kraków Główny. The neighbourhood also has the Presbyterian Warsaw Korean Church at 63D Farbiarska Street, as well as the Pyry Cemetery, operated by the Sts. Apostles Peter and Paul Church in the nearby Pyry.

Jeziorki Północne also has several ponds, including Kądziołeczka, Krosno, Łużek, and Szyja, as well as two artificial waterways Grabów Canal, and Jeziorki Ditch.

== Boundaries ==
Jeziorki Północne is a City Information System area, located in the south-western portion of the Ursynów district. Its boundaries are approximately determined by the Warsaw Metro railway branch line, Czempińska Street, and Karnawał Street, to the north; Wędrowców Street, and Farbiarska Street to the east; Baletowa Street to the south; and the boundaries of the Ursynów district to the west. The neighbourhood borders Grabów to the north, Pyry to the east, Dąbrówka to the southeast, Jeziorki Południowe to the south, and the municipality of Raszyn in Pruszków County.
