= Karczunek, Warsaw =

Neighbourhood of Warsaw, Poland

Karczunek
- Neighbourhood
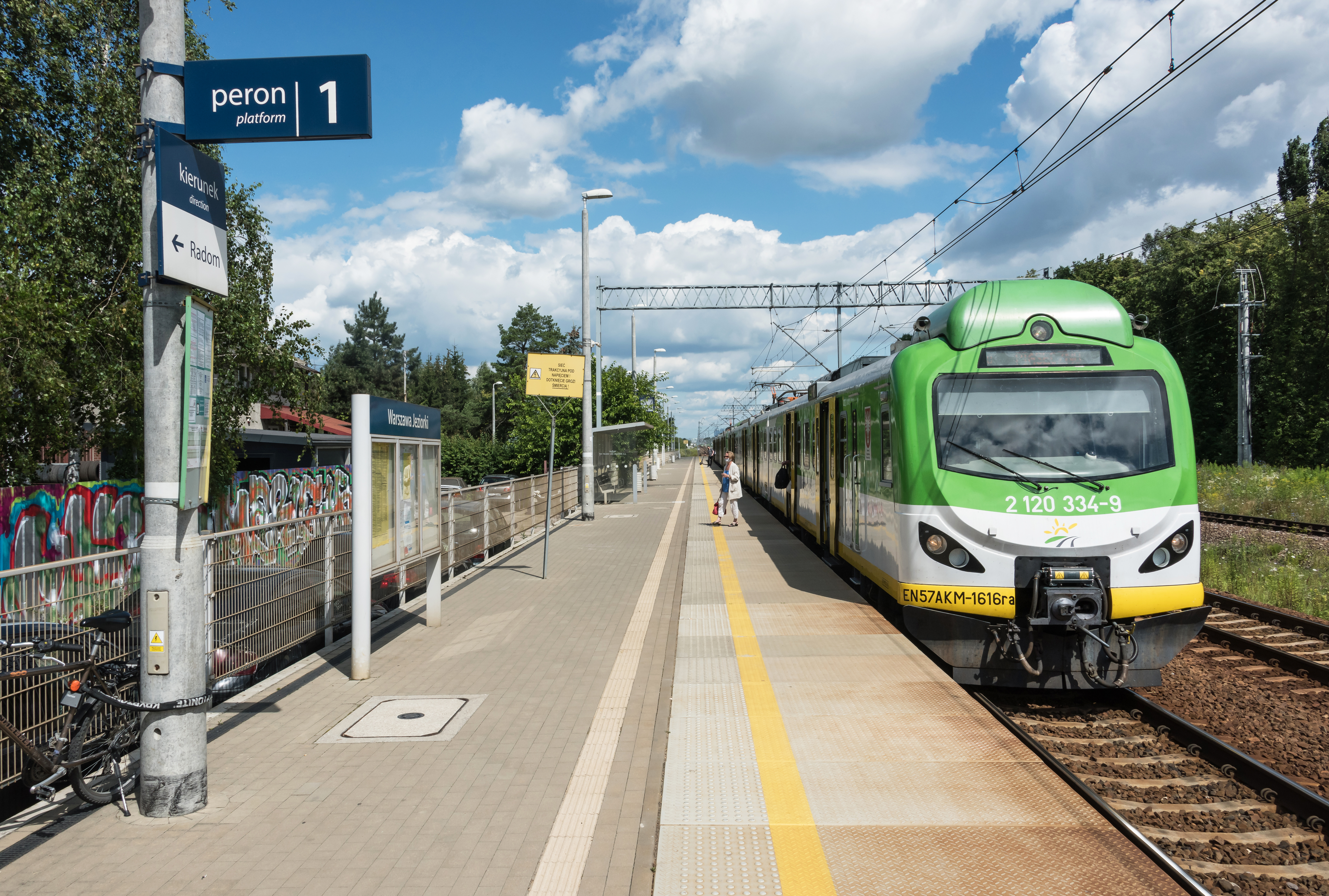
- The Warszawa Jeziorki railway station in Karczunek.
- Interactive map of Karczunek
- Coordinates: 52.107830°N 20.990600°E
- Country: Poland
- Voivodeship: Masovian
- City and county: Warsaw
- District: Ursynów
- City Information System area: Jeziorki Południowe
- Administrative neighbourhoods: Jeziorki
- Time zone: UTC+1 (CET)
  - Summer (DST): UTC+2 (CEST)
- Area code: +48 22

Karczunek (Polish: [kar't͡ʂu.nɛk]) is a neighbourhood in Warsaw, Poland, within the Ursynów district. It belongs to the administrative neighbourhood of Jeziorki, and the City Information System area of Jeziorki Południowe. It is a residential area with low-rise single-family housing, located alongside Kurantów Street, near the intersection with Karczunkowska Street, and near the Warszawa Jeziorki railway station.

== Toponomy ==
The name of the neighbourhood comes from Polish term karczunek, meaning forest clraring. A mearby road is named after it, Karczunkowska Street.

== History ==
Karczunek used to be a village near Warsaw. It was incorporated into the city on 14 May 1951. A nearby road, which connected it to Warsaw, is now known as Karczunkowska Street.

In 1936, the Warszawa Jeziorki railway station was opened at the corner of Karczunkowska Street and Gogolińska Street, near Karczunek. Currently, it is operated by the Polish State Railways, as part of the railway line no. 8, between Warsaw West and Kraków Main stations.

In 1996, the area became part of the administrative neighbourhood of Jeziorki, as a subdivision of the municipality of Warsaw-Ursynów. In 1998, the Ursynów district was divided the City Information System areas, with neighbourhood of Karczunek becoming part of Jeziorki Południowe.

== Overview ==
Karczunek is a low-rise residential area with detached houses, located allongside Kurantów Street, and near the intersection with Karczunkowska Street. The neighbourhood is placed near the Warszawa Jeziorki, located at the corner of Karczunkowska Street and Gogolińska Street, and operated by the Polish State Railways, as part of the railway line no. 8, between Warsaw West and Kraków Main stations.

The neighbourhood is administered by the neighbourhood of Jeziorki, governed by locally elected councils.
