= Ludwinów, Warsaw =

Neighbourhood in Warsaw, Poland

Ludwinów
- Neighbourhood
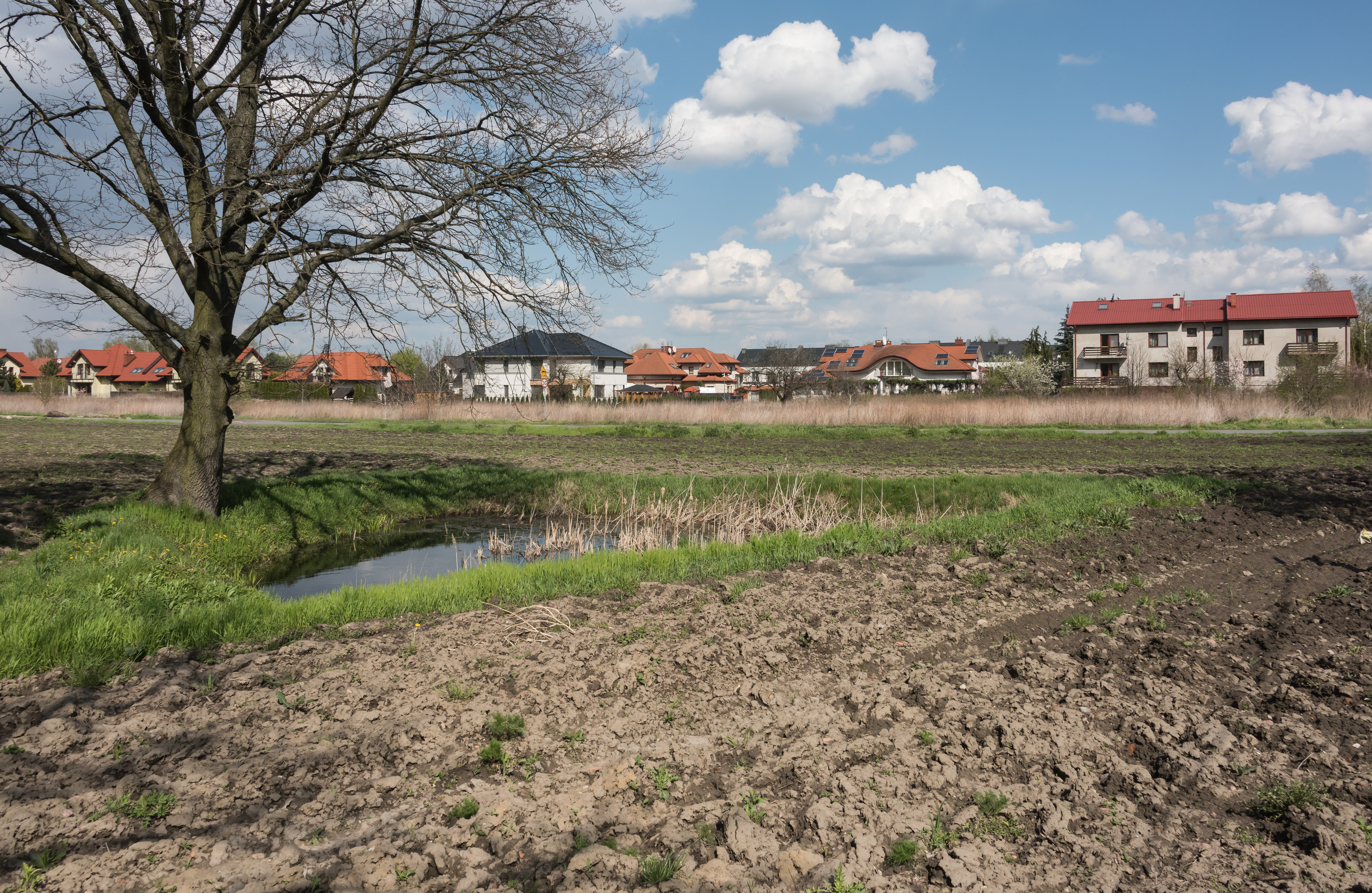
- Houses in Ludwinów, near the crossing of Ludwinowska Street and Kujawska Street, in 2021.
- Interactive map of Ludwinów
- Coordinates: 52°08′03″N 21°00′09″E
- Country: Poland
- Voivodeship: Masovian
- City and county: Warsaw
- District: Ursynów
- City Information System area: Jeziorki Północne
- Municipal neighbourhood: Jeziorki
- Establishment: 1864
- Time zone: UTC+1 (CET)
  - Summer (DST): UTC+2 (CEST)
- Area code: +48 22

Ludwinów (Polish: [ludˈvin.uf]) is a neighbourhood in Warsaw, Poland, within the district of Ursynów. It is part of the municipal neighbourhood of Jeziorki, and the City Information System area of Jeziorki Północne. The neighbourhood consists of lowrise single-family housing.

The village of Ludwinów was founded in 1864 by German settlers. In 1951, it was incorporated into the city of Warsaw.

== History ==
In 1864, the village of Ludwinów was founded by German settlers. It was located to the north of Jeziorki in the area of current Ludwinowska Street.

On 14 May 1951, Ludwinów was incorporated into the city of Warsaw.

In 1996, Ludwinów became part of the municipal neighbourhood of Jeziorki, a subdivision of the municipality of Warsaw-Ursynów, which was replaced by the district of Ursynów in 2002.

In 1998, the district of Ursynów was subdivided into the City Information System areas, with Ludwinów becoming part of Jeziorki Północne.

== Characteristics ==
Jeziorki is a residential area consisting of low-rise single-family housing. It is located in the area of Ludwinowska Street, within the district of Ursynów, within the municipal neighbourhood of Jeziorki, and the City Information System area of Jeziorki Północne.
