= Zgorzała nad Jeziorem =

Neighbourhood in Warsaw, Poland

- Neighbourhood
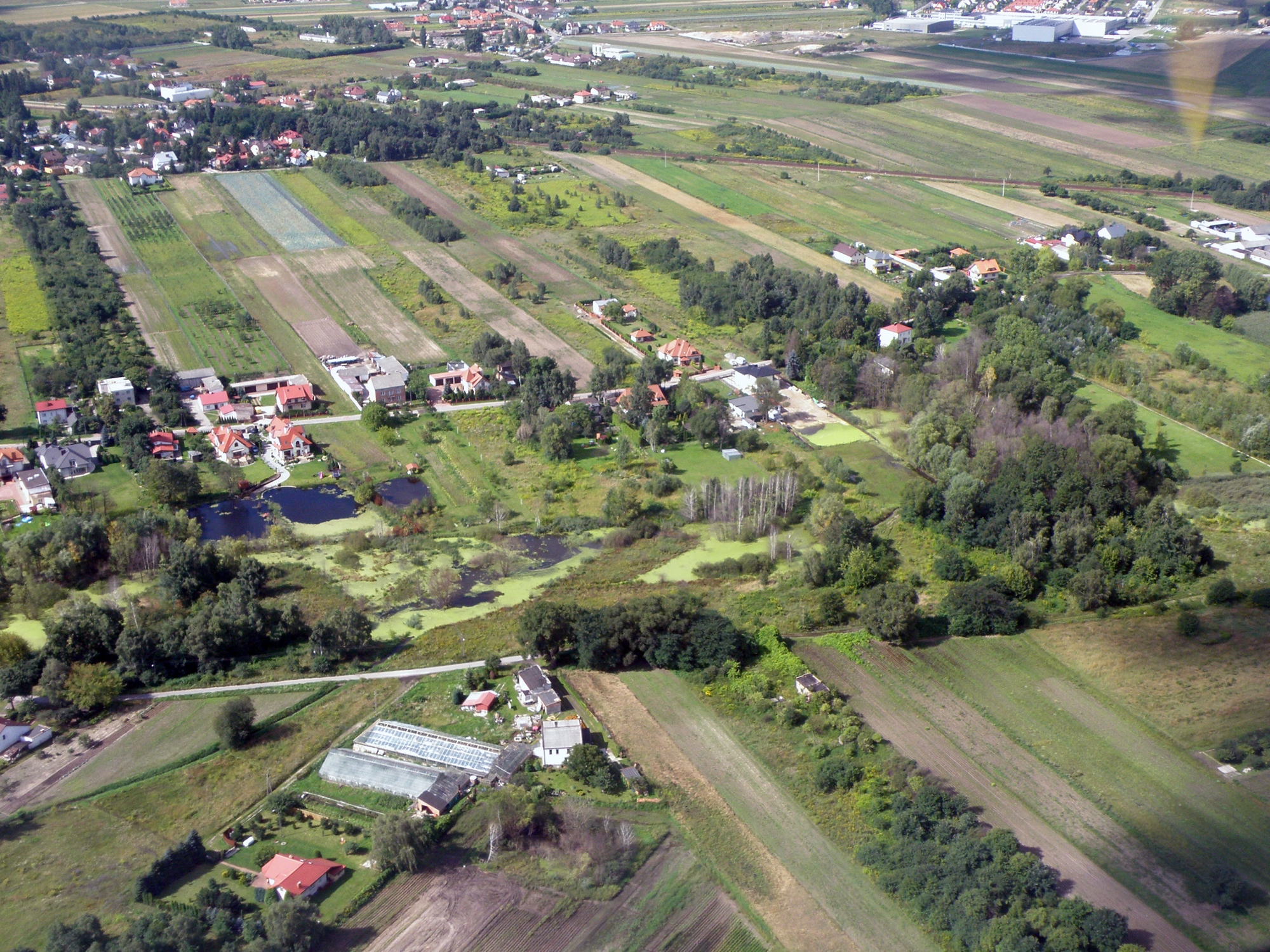
- Houses in Zgorzała nad Jeziorem, alongside Trombity Street and near Zgorzała lake, in 2011.
- Interactive map of Zgorzała nad Jeziorem
- Coordinates: 52°06′55″N 21°00′04″E
- Country: Poland
- Voivodeship: Masovian
- City and county: Warsaw
- District: Ursynów
- City Information System area: Jeziorki Południowe
- Municipal neighbourhood: Jeziorki
- Time zone: UTC+1 (CET)
  - Summer (DST): UTC+2 (CEST)
- Area code: +48 22

Zgorzała nad Jeziorem (Polish: [zɡɔˈʐa.wa ˈnat jɛˈʑɔ.rɛm]; lit. 'Zagorzała upon Lake') is a neighbourhood in Warsaw, Poland, within the district of Ursynów. It is part of the municipal neighbourhood of Jeziorki, and the City Information System area of Jeziorki Południowe. The neighbourhood consists of low-rise single-family housing centred on Trombity Street, and is placed near Zgorzała lake.
