= Pyry, Warsaw =

Neighbourhood of Warsaw, Poland

Pyry
- City Information System area (neighbourhood)
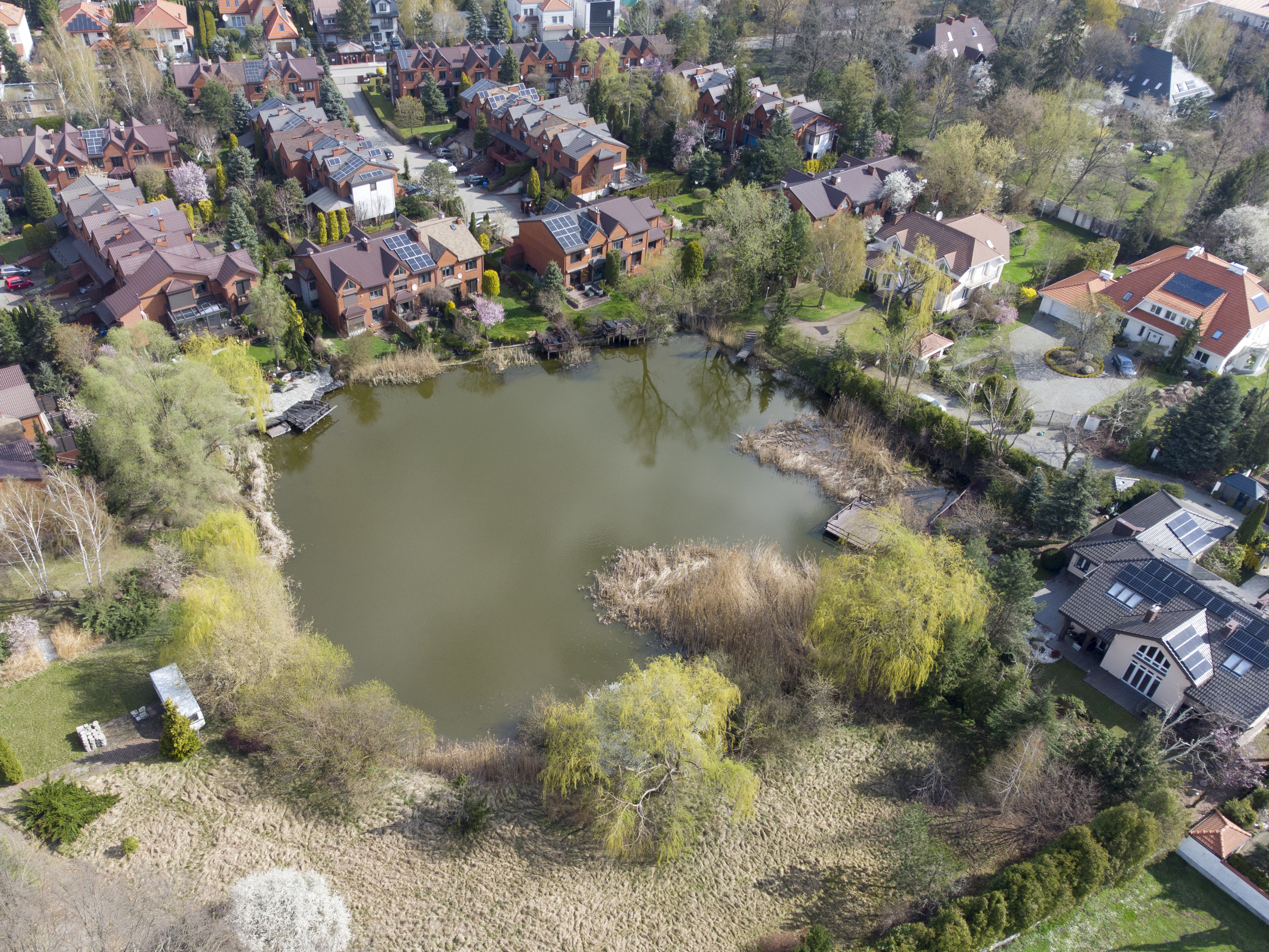
- Houses around the Wingert Lake in Pyry.

- Location of the City Information System area of Pyry, within the district of Ursynów in Warsaw.
- Coordinates: 52°07′46″N 21°01′04″E
- Country: Poland
- Voivodeship: Masovian
- City and county: Warsaw
- District: Ursynów

Area
  - Total: 1.98 km^{2} (0.76 sq mi)
- Time zone: UTC+1 (CET)
  - Summer (DST): UTC+2 (CEST)
- Area code: +48 22

Pyry (Polish: [ˈpɘ̟.rɘ̟]) is a neighbourhood, and a City Information System area, in Warsaw, Poland, within the Ursynów district. It is a residential area with single-family housing. The neighbourhood is governed by an elected council, and has an area of 1.98 km^{2} (0.76 sq mi). It features the Sts. Apostles Peter and Paul Church, which was built between 1946 and 1973, and is a seat of a Roman Catholic parish.

Pyry was founded in the 18th century as a farming community. In the late 1930s, a military complex of the Cipher Bureau was construed, were from 1937 to 1939, Marian Rejewski, Jerzy Różycki, and Henryk Zygalski have worked on developing the decryption techniques of the Enigma machine used by the Nazi Germany. The village was incorporated into Warsaw in 1951.

== History ==
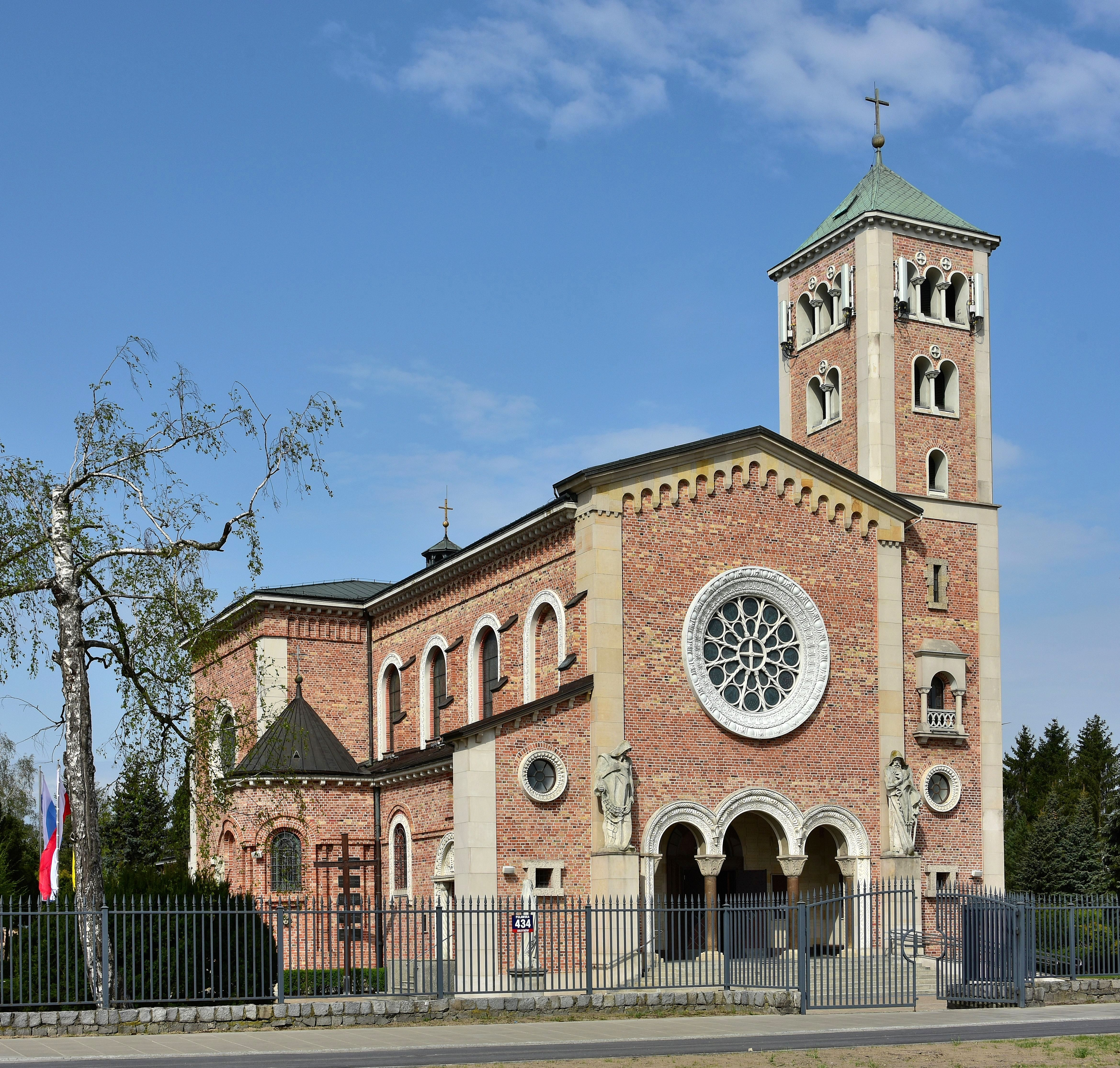
The Sts. Apostles Peter and Paul Church, built between 1946 and 1973.

Pyry, historically known as Pery, was founded in the 18th century, originally being a southern extension of the village of Imielin. It was a farming community with a few households.

On 30 November 1898, the Pyry narrow-gauge railway station was opened at the current intersection of Puławska, Akustyczna, and Leśna Streets. It was operated by the Grójec Commuter Railway, as part of the line between Warszawa Mokotów and Nowe Miasto nad Pilicą stations. It was closed on 1 December 1969. The presence the railway station had greatly increased development of the village. In 1921, it was inhabited by 421 people in 60 households.

During the interwar period, Pyry was a holiday village. In the 1930s, a military complex of the General Staff of the Polish Armed Forces was constructed in Pyry, at 8 Kajakowa Street, and in the nearby Kabaty Woods. From 1937 to 1939, it housed a branch of the Cipher Bureau, responsible for deciphering German codes and messages. A team of mathematicians employed by it, consisting of Marian Rejewski, Jerzy Różycki, and Henryk Zygalski, was the first to decipher coding of the Enigma machine in 1932. They continued their work and shared their decryption techniques there with British and French intelligence agencies in June 1939. Currently, since 2002, it houses the Air Operations Centre and Air Component Command of the Polish Air Force.

On 8 September 1939, Pyry was captured by the German forces during their invasion into Poland in first days of the Second World War.

Between 1946 and 1973, the Sts. Apostles Peter and Paul Church was built at 434 Puławska Street, belonging to the Catholic denomination. The Pyry Cemetery was also opened nearby at Łagiewnicka Street in 1946. Currently, it is located within the nearby neighbourhood of Jeziorki.

Pyry was incorporated into the city of Warsaw on 14 May 1951. In 1996, the neighbourhood of Pyry was established as an administrative unit governed locally by an elected council. It was a subdivision of the municipality of Warsaw-Ursynów, which was replaced by the city district of Ursynów in 2002. Its status was reconfirmed in 2013. In 1998, the district of Ursynów was subdivided into thirteen areas of the City Information System, with Pyry becoming one of them.

In 1998, the Rodan Systems Building was opened at 465 Puławska Street. It was awarded the First Degree Award of the Minister of the Interior and Administration in 1999, and is regarded as a prime example of the 1990s and post-communist architecture in Poland.

== Characteristics ==
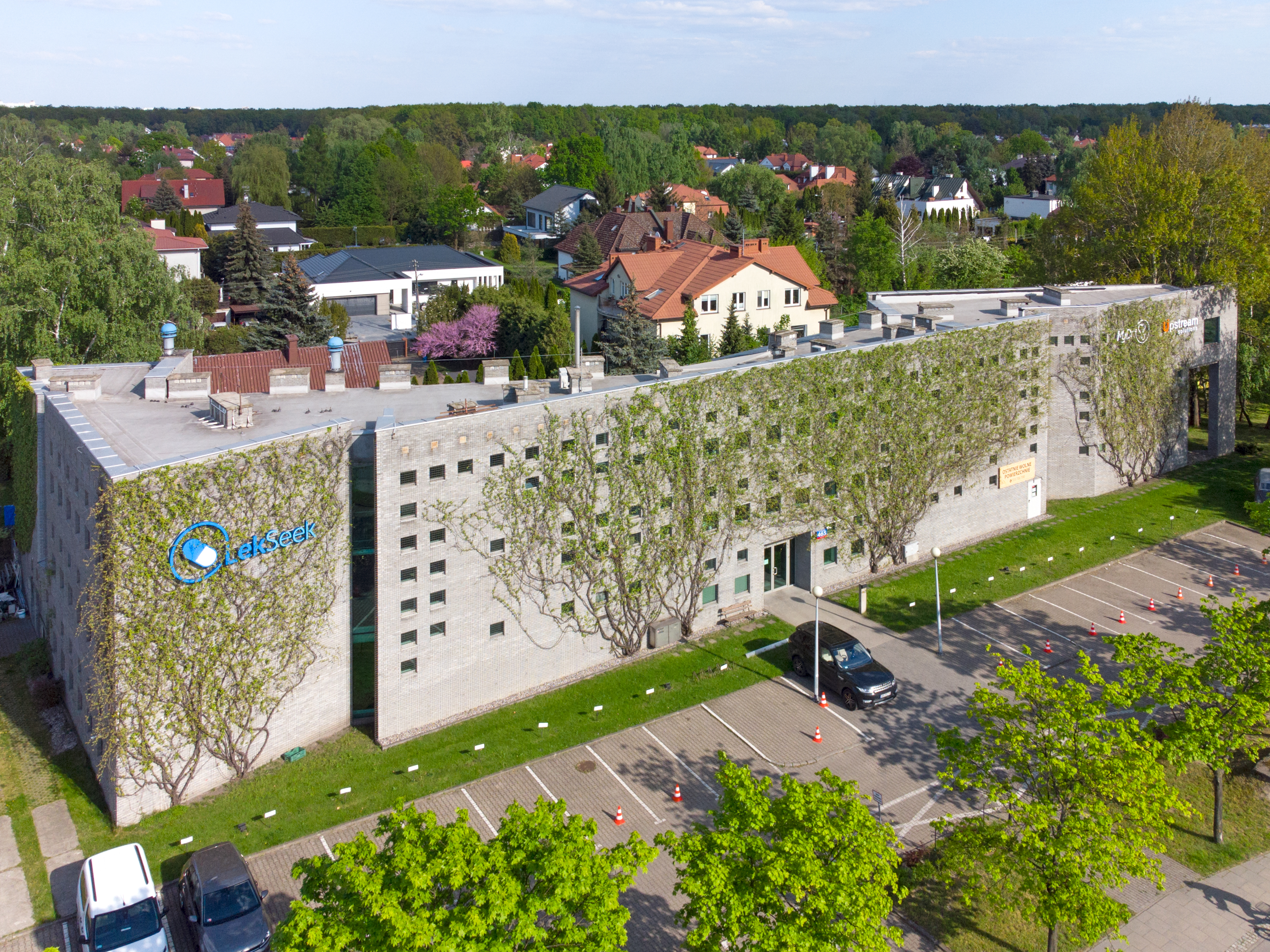
The Rodan Systems Building, regarded as a prime example of the 1990s and post-communist architecture in Poland.

Pyry is a neighbourhood, and an area of the City Information System, located in the south-central portion of the Ursynów district. It has a total area of 1.98 km^{2} (0.76 sq mi), and is governed by a neighbourhood council, consisting of 15 elected officials. Pyry is a residential area with of single-family housing. It features the Sts. Apostles Peter and Paul Church at 434 Puławska Street, which belongs to the Catholic denomination, and Rodan Systems Building, an office building at 465 Puławska Street, which is regarded as a prime example of 1990s and post-communist architecture in Poland. Additionally, the neighbourhood also includes the military complex of the Air Operations Centre – Air Component Command of the Polish Air Force, located at 8 Kajakowa Street, and in the nearby Kabaty Woods. Pyry also feature the Wingert Lake with an area of 0.3486 ha, located near Farbiarska and Głusza Streets.

== Location and boundaries ==
Pyry is a neighbourhood, and a City Information System area in Warsaw, located within the south-central portion of the Ursynów district. To the north, its boundary is determined by the Warsaw Metro branch line; to the east, by the Kabaty Woods Nature Reserve; to the south, by Baletowa Street, Puławskska Street, and the parcels adjusted to the southern part of Tukana Street; and to the west, by Farbiarska Street.

The City Information System area borders Grabów, and Old Imielin to the north, Kabaty Woods Nature Reserve to the east, Dąbrówka to the south, Jeziorki Południowe to the southwest, and Jeziorki Północne to the west. The administrative neighbourhood of Pyry borders Dąbrówka to the north, and Jeziorki to the west.
