= Wingert Lake =

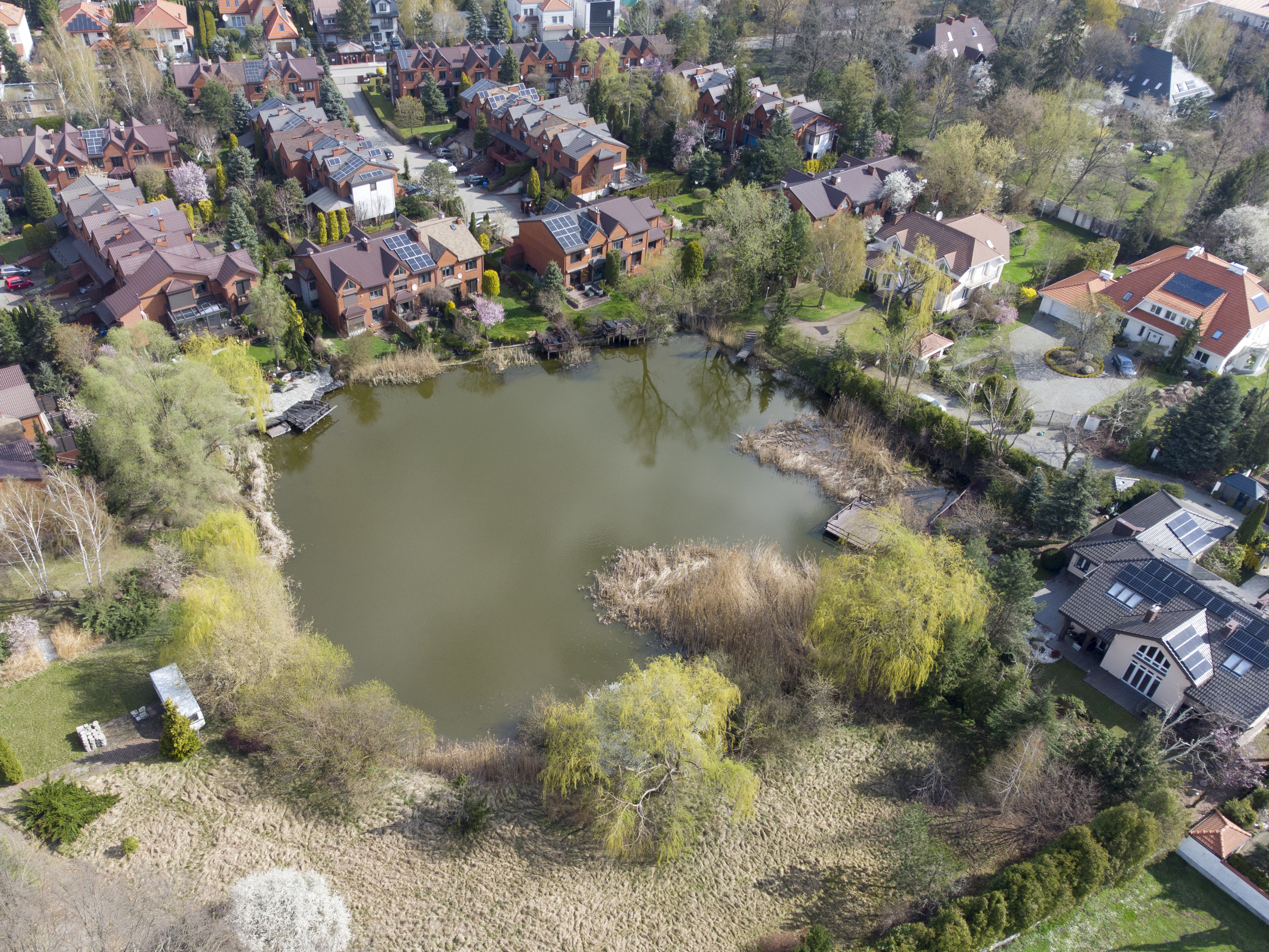
- The Wingert Lake in 2022.

- Location within Poland
- Location: Pyry, Ursynów, Warsaw, Poland
- Coordinates: 52°07′57″N 21°00′47″E
- Lake type: Lake
- Surface area: 0.3486 ha (0.861 acres)

The Wingert Lake (Polish pronunciation: [ˈvin.ɡɛrt]; German: [ˈvɪŋɐt]; Polish: Jezioro Wingerta), also known as the Wingert Pond (Polish: Staw Wingerta) is a lake in the city of Warsaw, Poland, within the district of Ursynów. It is located in the neighbourhood of Pyry, near Farbiarska Street and Głusza Street.

== Characteristics ==
The Wingert Lake is located in the city district of Ursynów, in the neighbourhood of Pyry, near Farbiarska Street and Głusza Street. It is placed within the drainage basin of the Grabów Canal, and has the total area of 0.3486 ha. Its name comes from the family name of one of its previous owners.
