= Sts. Apostles Peter and Paul Church (Ursynów) =

Roman Catholic church in Warsaw, Poland

Coordinates: 52°07′31.2″N 21°01′01.9″E

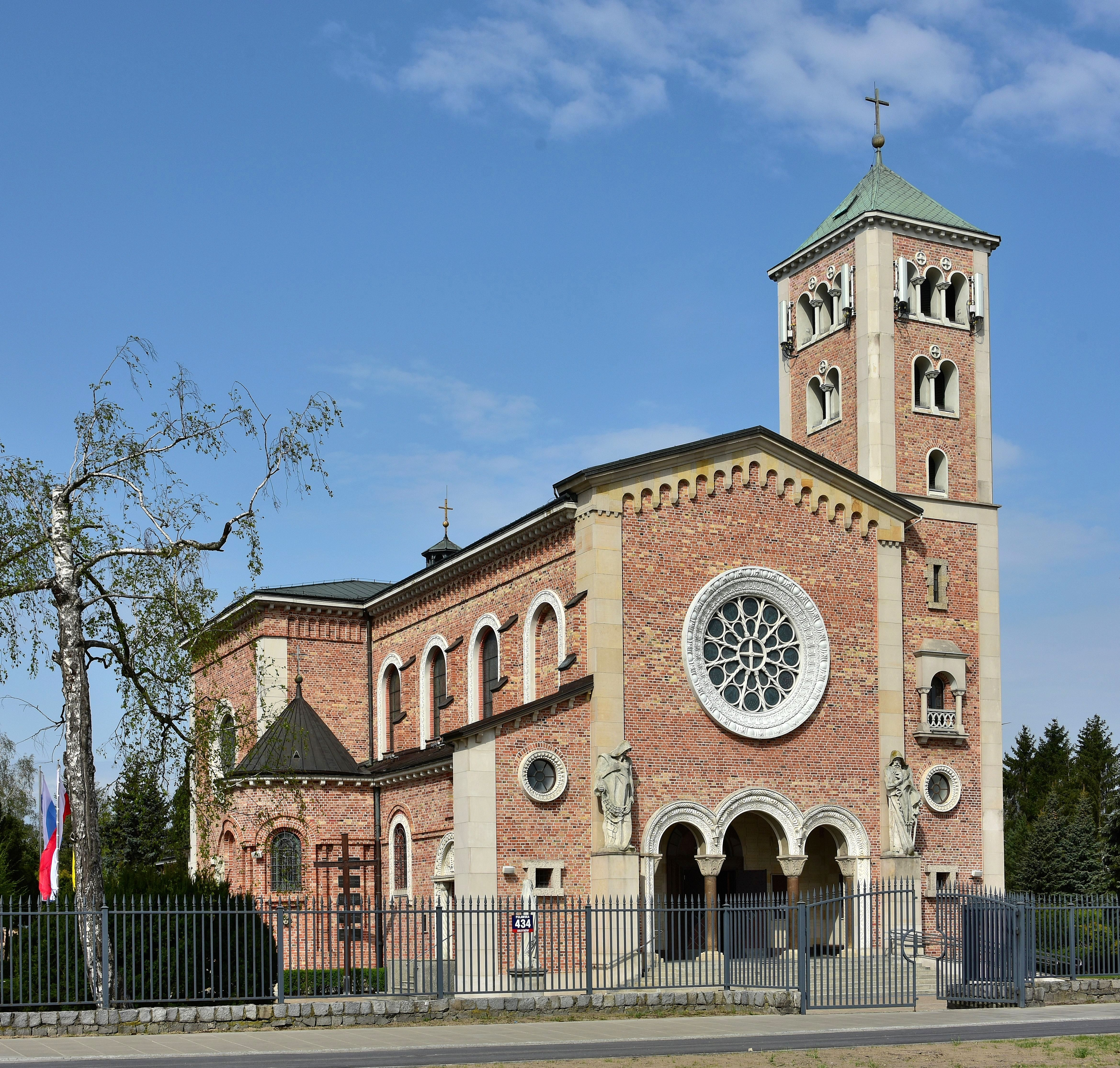
- The church in 2019.

- Location in Warsaw, Poland
- Location: 434 Puławska Street, Ursynów, Warsaw
- Country: Poland
- Denomination: Roman Catholic
- Website: www.parafiapyry.pl

History
- Status: Active
- Dedication: Saint Peter; Saint Paul
- Consecrated: 14 September 1973

Architecture
- Functional status: Parish church
- Architect: Antoni Jawornicki
- Style: Romanesque Revival
- Groundbreaking: 9 November 1946

Administration
- Archdiocese: Warsaw
- Deanery: Ursynów
- Parish: Sts. Apostles Peter and Paul

The Sts. Apostles Peter and Paul Church (Polish: Kościół Świętych Apostołów Piotra i Pawła) is a Romanesque Revival Roman Catholic parish church in Warsaw, Poland, located within the Ursynów district. It is placed at 434 Puławska Street, within the neighbourhood of Pyry. Its construction was begun in 1946, and it was consecrated in 1973. The building was designed by Antoni Jawornicki, with its interiors designed by Czesław Sosnowski. The church is dedicated to Saint Peter and Saint Paul, who, in the Christian theology, were the apostles who spread the teachings of Jesus Christ in the first-century AD. Saint Peter was also the first Pope, the leader of the Catholic Church.

== History ==
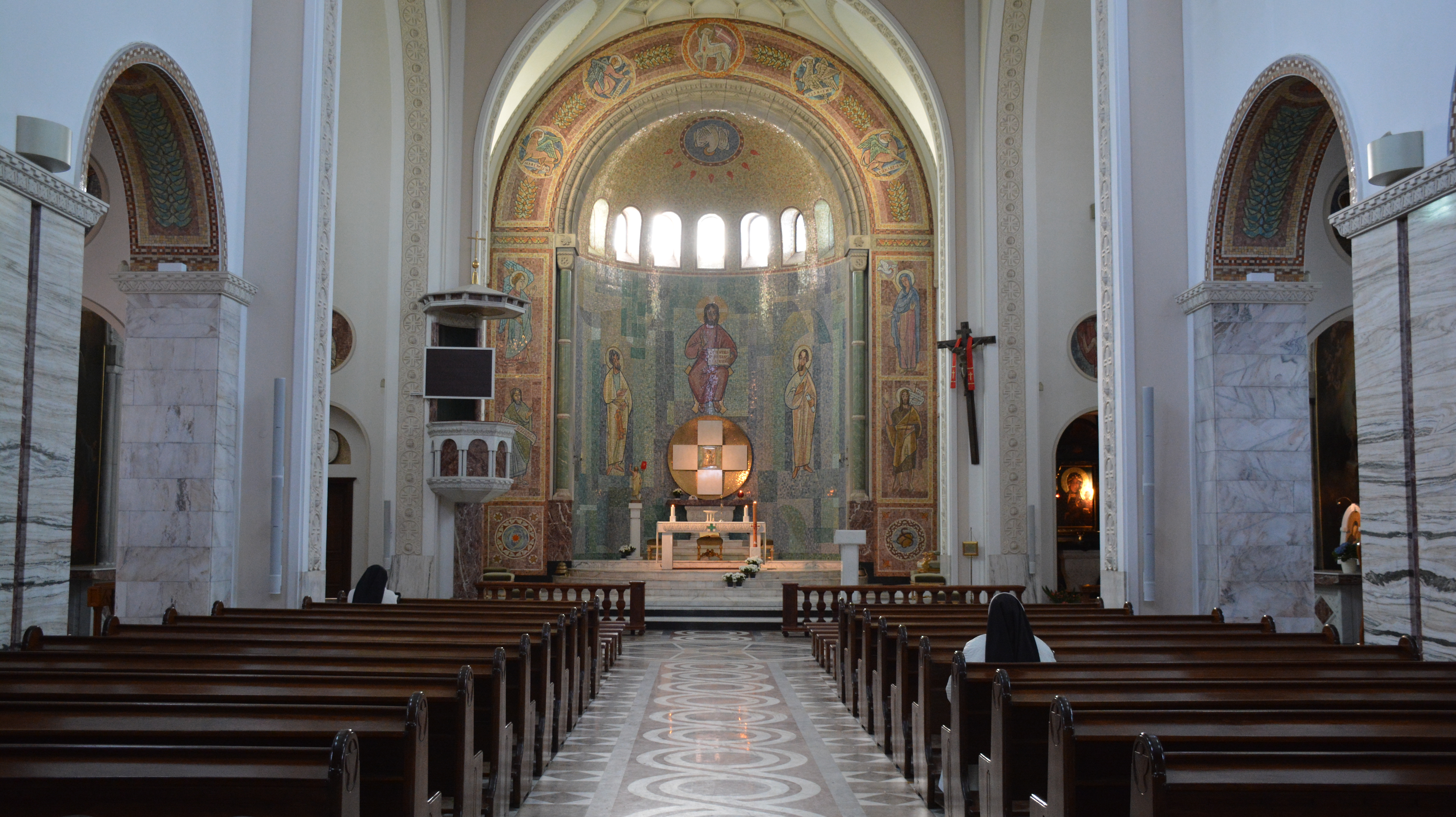
The church interior.

In 1922, a wooden Roman Catholic chapel, named after Anthony of Padua, was built in the village of Pyry. It was consecrated on 18 June 1922 by the parson of the Parish of St. Catherine in Służew. The area was incorporated into the city of Warsaw in 1951.

On 10 March 1946, priest Zygmunt Choromański, the apostolic pronotary and the administrator of the Archdiocese of Warsaw, founded a new parish in Pyry, separating it from Służew. It was apprved on 26 June 1947, by cardinal August Hlond, the primate of Poland, naming if after Saint Peter and Saint Paul, who, in the Christian theology, were the apostles who spread the teachings of Jesus Christ in the first-century AD. Saint Peter was also the first Pope, the leader of the Catholic Church.

The church building was designed in Romanesque Revival style by Antoni Jawornicki, with cooperation with engineer Stanisław Credo. Its interiors were designed by Czesław Sosnowski. Its foundations were laid on 9 November 1946. Three Polish złoty coins, dating to the interwar period, were placed among them. This included two 5 złoty coins, and one 10 złoty coin, with an image of Józef Piłsudski, the Chief of State of Poland from 1918 to 1922, and the Marshal of Poland from 1920 to 1935. The cornerstone was blessed by priest Wacław Majewski, during the celebrations of the Feast of Saints Peter and Paul on 29 June 1947. The foundation document, enclosed in a brass artillery shell from the Second World War, was walled up in a collumnt on the right side of the chancel. In 1951, the Communist government ordered the construction to be stopped, without stating an official reason for its decision. However, it was continued regardless.

To commemorate the construction of the church during the celebrations of the Millenium of the Baptism of Poland in 1966, an inscription was craved in its inside. It reads "966 — 1966; Wierni Bogu, Krzyżowi i Ewangelii, Kościołowi Świętemu i Jego Pasterzom", and translates fro Polish to "966 — 1966; Faithful to God, the Cross and the Gospel, the Holy Church and its Shepherds". It also included names of numerous localities and names of the parish members most meritorious for the construction of the church.

In 1970, inspired by the December protests, the parish administration begun the construction of a bell tower, which while envisioned in the original project, was prohibited by the government. It was finished on 2 July 1971, after two months of consultation. On 14 July, it was topped with a Christian cross, symbolically celebrating the church's victory over government. Three bells, named Piotr i Paweł, Stefan, and Henryk, were consecrated on 1 April 1973 by bishop Jerzy Modzelewski. The church eas consecrated on 14 September 1973 by primate of Poland Stefan Wyszyński. During the ceremony, relics associated with martyrs Agnes of Rome and Gregory the Illuminator, were bricked up in an altar.
