= Dawidy, Pruszków County =

Dawidy
- Village
- Location within Poland
- Coordinates: 52°8′5″N 20°58′33″E
- Country: Poland
- Voivodeship: Masovian
- County: Pruszków
- Gmina: Raszyn
- Population: 450

Dawidy [daˈvidɨ] is a village in the administrative district of Gmina Raszyn, within Pruszków County, Masovian Voivodeship, in east-central Poland.
