= List of districts and neighbourhoods in Warsaw =

Districts of Warsaw (since 2002)

Warsaw is a city with powiat rights, and is further divided into 18 districts (dzielnica pronounced [ˈd͡ʑɛlɲit͡sa]), auxiliary units which are legally integral parts of the city as an entity, but with some limited powers devolved to their own local governments (or ‘self-governments’ as they are typically referred to in Polish).

The current division into quarters was established in 2002. The 18 districts are informally divided broadly into the inner and outer city quarters, as follows:

- Inner city districts
  - Śródmieście
  - Mokotów
  - Ochota
  - Wola
  - Żoliborz
  - Praga Południe
  - Praga Północ
- Outer city (or "wreath") districts
  - Bemowo
  - Białołęka
  - Bielany
  - Rembertów
  - Targówek
  - Ursus
  - Ursynów
  - Wawer
  - Wesoła
  - Wilanów
  - Włochy

== Districts of Warsaw ==
District	Population	Area
Mokotów	220,682	35.4 km^{2} (13.7 sq mi)
Praga-Południe	178,665	22.4 km^{2} (8.6 sq mi)
Ursynów	145,938	48.6 km^{2} (18.8 sq mi)
Wola	137,519	19.26 km^{2} (7.44 sq mi)
Bielany	132,683	32.3 km^{2} (12.5 sq mi)
Targówek	123,278	24.37 km^{2} (9.41 sq mi)
Śródmieście	122,646	15.57 km^{2} (6.01 sq mi)
Bemowo	115,873	24.95 km^{2} (9.63 sq mi)
Białołęka	96,588	73.04 km^{2} (28.20 sq mi)
Ochota	84,990	09.7 km^{2} (3.7 sq mi)
Wawer	69,896	79.71 km^{2} (30.78 sq mi)
Praga-Północ	69,510	11.4 km^{2} (4.4 sq mi)
Ursus	53,755	09.35 km^{2} (3.61 sq mi)
Żoliborz	48,342	08.5 km^{2} (3.3 sq mi)
Włochy	38,075	28.63 km^{2} (11.05 sq mi)
Wilanów	23,960	36.73 km^{2} (14.18 sq mi)
Rembertów	23,280	19.30 km^{2} (7.45 sq mi)
Wesoła	22,811	22.6 km^{2} (8.7 sq mi)
Total	1,708,491	521.81 km^{2} (201.47 sq mi)

== Neighbourhoods ==
Each of the districts is customarily subdivided into several smaller areas, known under the designation of a neighbourhood (osiedle), a unit with no legal or administrative powers, used for statistics or as a designation within the City Information System (Miejski System Informacji).

Bemowo	Białołęka	Bielany
Bemowo-Lotnisko; Boernerowo; Chrzanów; Fort Bema; Fort Radiowo; Górce; Groty; Jelonki Północne; Jelonki Południowe; Lotnisko	Białołęka Dworska; Brzeziny; Choszczówka; Dąbrówka Szlachecka; Grodzisk; Henryków; Kobiałka; Nowodwory; Szamocin; Tarchomin; Żerań	Chomiczówka; Huta; Las Bielański; Młociny; Marymont-Kaskada; Marymont-Ruda; Piaski; Placówka; Radiowo; Słodowiec; Stare Bielany; Wólka Węglowa; Wawrzyszew; Wrzeciono
Mokotów	Ochota	Praga-Południe
Augustówka; Czerniaków; Ksawerów; Służew; Służewiec; Sadyba; Siekierki; Sielce; Stary Mokotów; Stegny; Wierzbno; Wyględów	Filtry; Rakowiec; Stara Ochota; Szczęśliwice	Gocław; Gocławek; Grochów; Kamionek; Olszynka Grochowska; Saska Kępa
Praga-Północ	Rembertów	Śródmieście
Nowa Praga; Pelcowizna; Stara Praga; Szmulowizna	Kawęczyn-Wygoda; Nowy Rembertów; Stary Rembertów	Muranów; New Town; North Downtown; Old Town; Powiśle; Polec; South Downtown; Ujazdów
Targówek	Ursus	Ursynów
Elsnerów; Bródno; Bródno Podgrodzie; Targówek Fabryczny; Targówek Mieszkaniowy; Zacisze; Utrata	Czechowice; Gołąbki; Niedźwiadek; Skorosze; Szamoty	Dąbrówka; Grabów; Jeziorki Północne; Jeziorki Południowe; Kabaty; Natolin; North Ursynów; Pyry; Skarpa Powsińska; Stary Służew; Stary Imielin; Ursynów-Centrum; Wyczółki
Wawer	Wesoła	Wilanów
Aleksandrów; Anin; Falenica; Las; Marysin Wawerski; Miedzeszyn; Międzylesie; Nadwiśle; Radość; Sadul; Wawer; Zerzeń	Groszówka; Plac Wojska Polskiego; Stara Miłosna; Wesoła-Centrum; Wola Grzybowska; Zielona-Grzybowa	Błonia Wilanowskie; Kępa Zawadowska; Powsin; Powsinek; Wilanów Królewski; Wilanów Niski; Wilanów Wysoki; Zawady
Włochy	Wola	Żoliborz
New Włochy; Old Włochy; Okęcie; Opacz Wielka; Paluch; Raków; Salomea; Załuski	Czyste; Koło; Młynów; Mirów; Nowolipki; Odolany; Powązki; Ulrychów	Marymont-Potok; Stary Żoliborz; Sady Żoliborskie

== Historical districts ==
=== 1994-2002 ===
No.	District
1	Warszawa-Bemowo
2	Warszawa-Białołęka
3	Warszawa-Bielany
4	Warszawa-Centrum
5	Warszawa-Rembertów
6	Warszawa-Targówek
7	Warszawa-Ursus
8	Warszawa-Ursynów
9	Warszawa-Wawer
10	Warszawa-Wilanów
11	Warszawa-Włochy

=== 1990-1994 ===
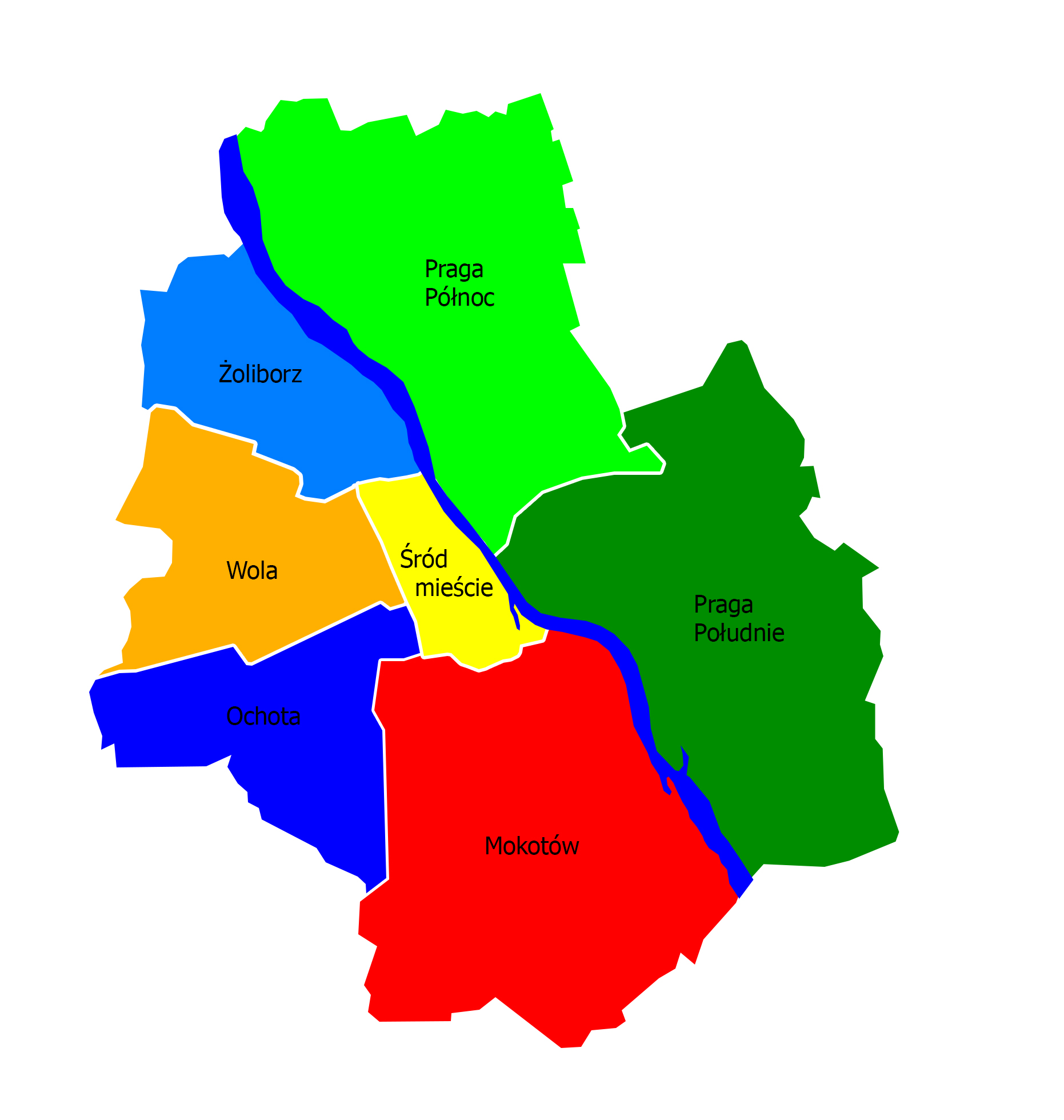
Warsaw in 1990-1993

No.	District
1	Mokotów
2	Ochota
3	Praga-Południe
4	Praga-Północ
5	Śródmieście
6	Ursus (1993-1994)
7	Wola
8	Żoliborz

=== 1959–1990 ===
No.	District
1	Śródmieście
2	Żoliborz
3	Wola
4	Ochota
5	Mokotów
6	Praga Północ
7	Praga Południe

=== 1951/1952–1959 ===
No.	District
1	Warszawa Śródmieście
2	Warszawa Stare Miasto
3	Warszawa Żoliborz
4	Warszawa Wola
5	Warszawa Ochota
6	Warszawa Mokotów
7	Warszawa Wilanów
8	Warszawa Praga Śródmieście
9	Warszawa Praga Północ
10	Warszawa Praga Południe
11	Warszawa Wawer
