= Gmina Warsaw-Ursynów =

Former county of Poland

- Urban municipality of Masovian Voivodeship
- 1994–2002
- Flag Coat of arms
- Capital: Warsaw
- Area
  - 1994: 44.59 km^{2} (17.22 sq mi)
- Population
  - 1994: 109,766
- Government
  - Type: Urban municipality
- Mayor
  - 1994–2002: Stanisław Faliński
- History
  - Established: 19 June 1994
  - Incorporation into the Masovian Voivodeship: 1 January 1999
  - Disestablished: 27 October 2002
- Contained within
  - Country: Poland
  - Voivodeship: Warsaw (1994–1998); Masovian (1999–2002)
  - County: Warsaw (1999–2002)
Preceded by	Succeeded by
Warsaw-Mokotów	Ursynów

Gmina Warsaw-Ursynów (Polish pronunciation: [urˈsɘ̟n.uf]; Polish: Gmina Warszawa-Ursynów) was an urban municipality in Poland, encompassing part of the city of Warsaw, corresponding to the area of the modern Ursynów district. It existed from 1994 to 2002, when it was incorporated into the current city district. The municipality originally belonged to the Warsaw Voivodeship, and in 1999, was incorporated into the Masovian Voivodeship. Since then it was also part of Warsaw County.

== History ==
The municipality was founded on 19 June 1994, during an administrative reform, from part of a former municipality of Warsaw-Mokotów. It became one of eleven municipalities, which together encompassed the city of Warsaw.

It was originally part of the Warsaw Voivodeship, and on 1 January 1999, was incorporated into the Masovian Voivodeship, as well as into Warsaw County, which was one of its subdivisions.

It was disestablished on 27 October 2002, and replaced by the city district of Ursynów.

== Government ==
The municipal government was divided into two branches: the management board as the executive branch, and an elected council with 25 members, as the legislative and regulatory branch. It was led by the mayor (Polish: burmistrz). Throughout the entirety of its existence, the office was held by Stanisław Faliński.
