= City-county (Poland) =

Polish counties with city rights

In Poland, a city with county rights (Polish: miasto na prawach powiatu), known as a city-county (Polish: miasto powiatowe) is a designation denoting 66 of the 107 cities (the urban municipalities which are governed by a city mayor) which exercise also the powers and duties of a county, thus being an independent city. They have roughly the same status as former county boroughs in the United Kingdom.

Sometimes, such a city will also be referred to in Polish as city county (Polish: powiat grodzki); this term however is not official (it was used during the interwar times of the Second Polish Republic). The contemporary term city with powiat rights should not be used interchangeably with the interwar city county.

Such cities are distinct from and independent of the 314 regular counties (sometimes referred as "land counties" (Polish: powiaty ziemskie), again a term that was used in the interwar period and is not used in modern Polish law).

== List of cities with county rights ==
City county	Voivodeship	Area (km²)	Population
Biała Podlaska	Lublin	49.40	58,010
Białystok	Podlaskie	102.12	295,210
Bielsko-Biała	Silesian	124.51	176,678
Bydgoszcz	Kuyavian-Pomeranian	175	364,953
Bytom	Silesian	69.43	187,205
Chełm	Lublin	35.28	67,989
Chorzów	Silesian	33.5	114,434
Częstochowa	Silesian	160	246,129
Dąbrowa Górnicza	Silesian	188	129,753
Elbląg	Warmian-Masurian	80	127,055
Gdańsk	Pomeranian	262	457,630
Gdynia	Pomeranian	136	252,443
Gliwice	Silesian	134.20	199,099
Gorzów Wielkopolski	Lubusz	86	125,204
Grudziądz	Kuyavian-Pomeranian	57.76	99,299
Jastrzębie-Zdrój	Silesian	85.44	95,149
Jaworzno	Silesian	152.2	96,051
Jelenia Góra	Lower Silesian	109.22	86,663
Kalisz	Greater Poland	70	108,575
Katowice	Silesian	164.67	315,996
Kielce	Świętokrzyskie	109.65	207,718
Konin	Greater Poland	82	80,618
Koszalin	West Pomeranian	84	107,783
Kraków	Lesser Poland	327	804,237
Krosno	Subcarpathian	43.48	47,693
Legnica	Lower Silesian	56.29	105,485
Leszno	Greater Poland	31.9	64,079
Łódź	Łódź	293	655,279
Łomża	Podlaskie	32.72	63,572
Lublin	Lublin	147	354,272
Mysłowice	Silesian	65.57	74,988
Nowy Sącz	Lesser Poland	57	84,594
Olsztyn	Warmian-Masurian	88.328	174,693
Opole	Opole	96.2	128,034
Ostrołęka	Masovian	29.00	53,758
Piekary Śląskie	Silesian	40	59,494
Piotrków Trybunalski	Łódź	67.27	79,367
Płock	Masovian	88.06	127,307
Poznań	Greater Poland	262	566,546
Przemyśl	Subcarpathian	44	66,715
Radom	Masovian	111.71	226,372
Ruda Śląska	Silesian	77.7	145,929
Rybnik	Silesian	148	141,382
Rzeszów	Subcarpathian	77.31	163,155
Siedlce	Masovian	32	77,047
Siemianowice Śląskie	Silesian	25.5	72,451
Skierniewice	Łódź	32.6	48,761
Słupsk	Pomeranian	43.15	98,402
Sopot	Pomeranian	17.31	39,836
Sosnowiec	Silesian	91.26	225,202
Suwałki	Podlaskie	65.24	69,234
Świętochłowice	Silesian	13.22	55,172
Świnoujście	West Pomeranian	197.23	40,899
Szczecin	West Pomeranian	301	410,809
Tarnobrzeg	Subcarpathian	85.6	50,033
Tarnów	Lesser Poland	72.4	117,109
Toruń	Kuyavian-Pomeranian	115.72	207,381
Tychy	Silesian	81.72	130,842
Wałbrzych	Lower Silesian	84.70	120,197
Warsaw	Masovian	517	1,862,402
Włocławek	Kuyavian-Pomeranian	84.32	119,608
Wrocław	Lower Silesian	293	674,132
Zabrze	Silesian	80.47	190,610
Zamość	Lublin	30.34	66,613
Zielona Góra	Lubusz	58	118,201
Żory	Silesian	64.64	62,625

== See also ==
- Consolidated city-county
