= Jelonki (disambiguation) =

Jelonki is a neighborhood in Warsaw, Poland.

Jelonki may also refer to the following places:

- Jelonki (housing estate), a high-rise housing estate in Warsaw, Poland
- Jelonki, Gmina Ostrów Mazowiecka, Ostrów County in the Masovian Voivodeship (east-central Poland)
- Jelonki, Opole Voivodeship (south-west Poland)
- Jelonki, Warmian-Masurian Voivodeship (north Poland)
- Jelonki, Gryfino County in the West Pomeranian Voivodeship (north-west Poland)
- Jelonki, Świdwin County in the West Pomeranian Voivodeship (north-west Poland)

== See also ==
- Jelonki Północne, a neighbourhood in Warsaw, Poland
- Jelonki Południowe, a neighbourhood in Warsaw, Poland
- Stare Jelonki, a low-rise housing neighbourhood in Warsaw, Poland
