= Stare Jelonki =

Neighbourhood in Warsaw, Poland

- Neighbourhood
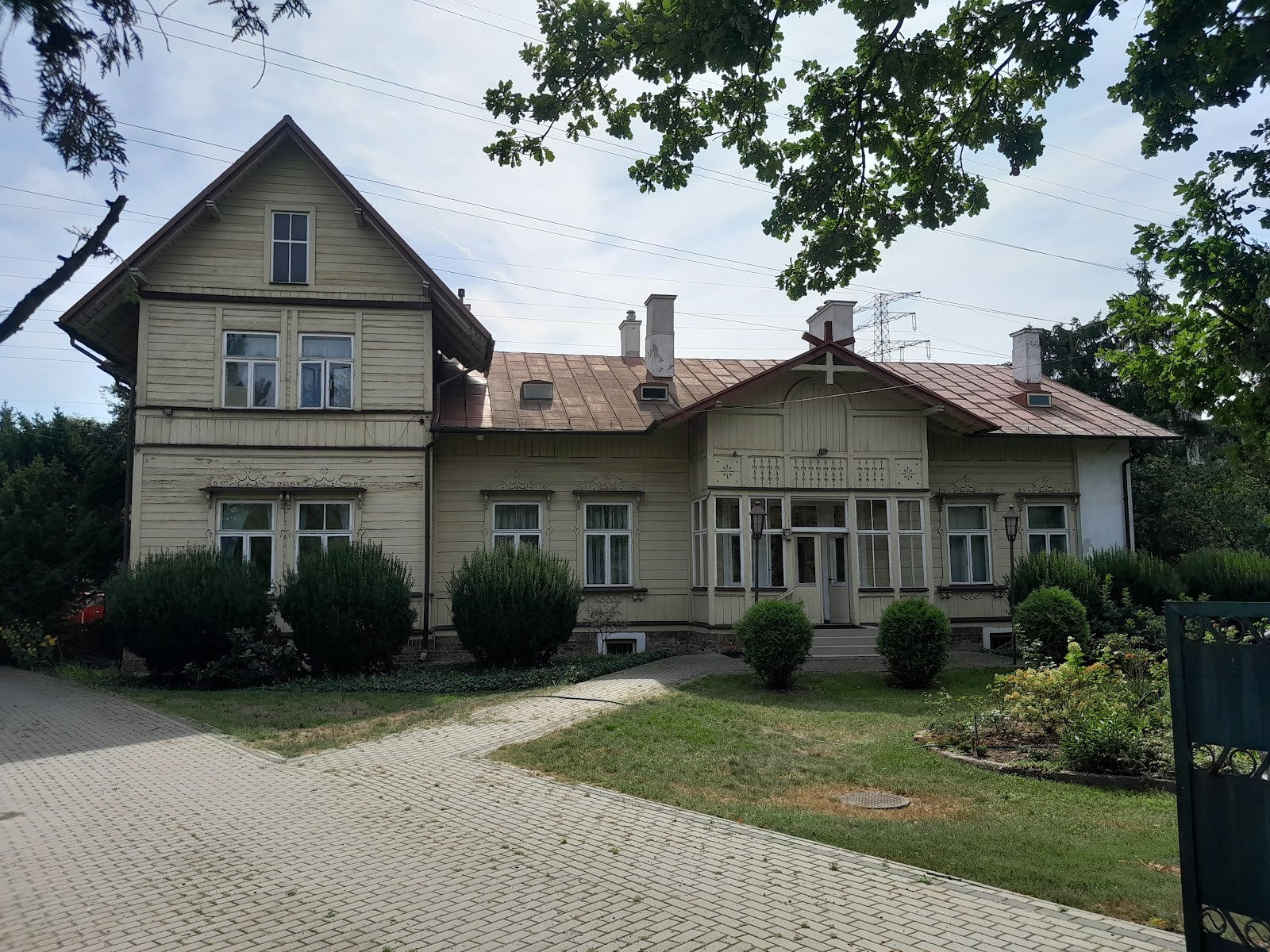
- The Schneider Villa at 59 Połczyńska Street, a historic building dating to 1902.
- Interactive map of Stare Jelonki
- Coordinates: 52.221587°N 20.909450°E
- Country: Poland
- Voivodeship: Masovian
- City county: Warsaw
- Districts: Bemowo; Wola
- City Information System areas: Jelonki Północne; Jelonki Południowe; Ulrychów
- Time zone: UTC+1 (CET)
  - Summer (DST): UTC+2 (CEST)
- Area code: +48 22

Stare Jelonki (Polish: [ˈsta.rɛ jɛ.lɔŋˈki]; lit. 'Old Jelonki') is a neighbourhood in Warsaw, Poland in the districts of Bemowo and Wola, and within the City Information System areas of Jelonki Północne, Jelonki Południowe, and Ulrychów. It is formed from two residential areas with low-rise single-family housing. It forms a historic portion of the larger neighbourhood of Jelonki.

Jelonki was founded in the 19th century as a small farming community. In the 1920s, its land was partitioned, and the village was developed as a garden suburb. It was incorporated into Warsaw in 1951.

== Toponomy ==
The name Jelonki is a Polish plural diminutive form of the term meaning cervus, a genus of deer which was present in the area. Historically, before 1951, the neighbourhood was also known as Jelonek, a singular diminutive form. Stare in its name translates to old referring to it being the historic area of the larger neighbourhood of Jelonki.

== History ==
=== Founding and development ===
A small farming community, later known as Jelonki, was established in the area in the 19th century, next to the village of Odolany, to the north of the Poznań Road (now Połczyńska Street). The village was bought by Bogumił Schneider, a businessman, who moved to the area from Westphalia. In the second half of the century, he built his residence in the form of a brick manor house, near the current Fortuny Street. In 1902, he also built a second residence, a wooden villa at the current 59 Połczyńska Street, which stands to this day. In 1904, the village had 729 inhabitants and included 19 houses and a school. After the purchase, the village began being known as Jelonki and Jelonek.

In 1846, the Bogumił Schneider Brickworks and Roof Tiles Factory (Polish: Zakłady Cegielniane i Fabryka Dachówek „Bogumił Schneider”), in the area, which produced bricks, roof tiles, and ceramics. The factory had a good reputation, being locally known for the good quality of its products. Many houses and tenements in Warsaw were built from its bricks. It was also commissioned by the Imperial Russian Army, to provide materials for the construction of Forts II, III, and IV of the Warsaw Fortress, a series of fortifications built around the city between 1883 and 1890. It extracted the clay for its products locally, leaving behind pits, some of which were later flooded, forming small ponds, including Jelonek and Schneider Clay Pits, which are present within the neighbourhood boundaries to the present day. The factory operated until 1940, when, while under German occupation, it was ordered to be closed down.

In 1927, inspired by the garden city movement, the Schneider family divided and sold a portion of their land, promoting the construction of villas and gardens in the village. They also founded a garden and a fruit tree orchard, located around their summer residence, and also drew plans of wide town streets, including Schneider Avenue, which currently forms Powstańców Śląskich Street. In 1932, the settlement had been renamed to Miasto-Ogród Jelonek (Garden Town of Jelonek). A marketplace, known as the John III Sobieski Square, now known as the Castellan Square, was also built there.

=== Second World War ===
Jelonki was captured by German forces in early September 1939 during the siege of Warsaw in the Second World War. On 18 September 1939, they were recaptured in a counter-offensive by the 360th Infantry Regiment of the Polish Armed Forces, commanded by lieutenant colonel Leopold Okulicki. Their forces included four infantry companies, with heavy machine gun platoons, and one mortar platoon. They were also supported by a artillery batteries, a platoon of 7TP light tanks, as well as a company of the Capital Battalion, with the latter being pushed back during the attacks. The motorized platoon suffered heavy loses in an encounter against German Panzer 35(t) light tanks. The village was recaptured with severe losses suffered by the Polish infantry, and remained under Polish control until the capitulation of Warsaw on 28 September 1939.

In 1943, the village had 3,826 inhabitants.

=== Expansion as a suburb ===
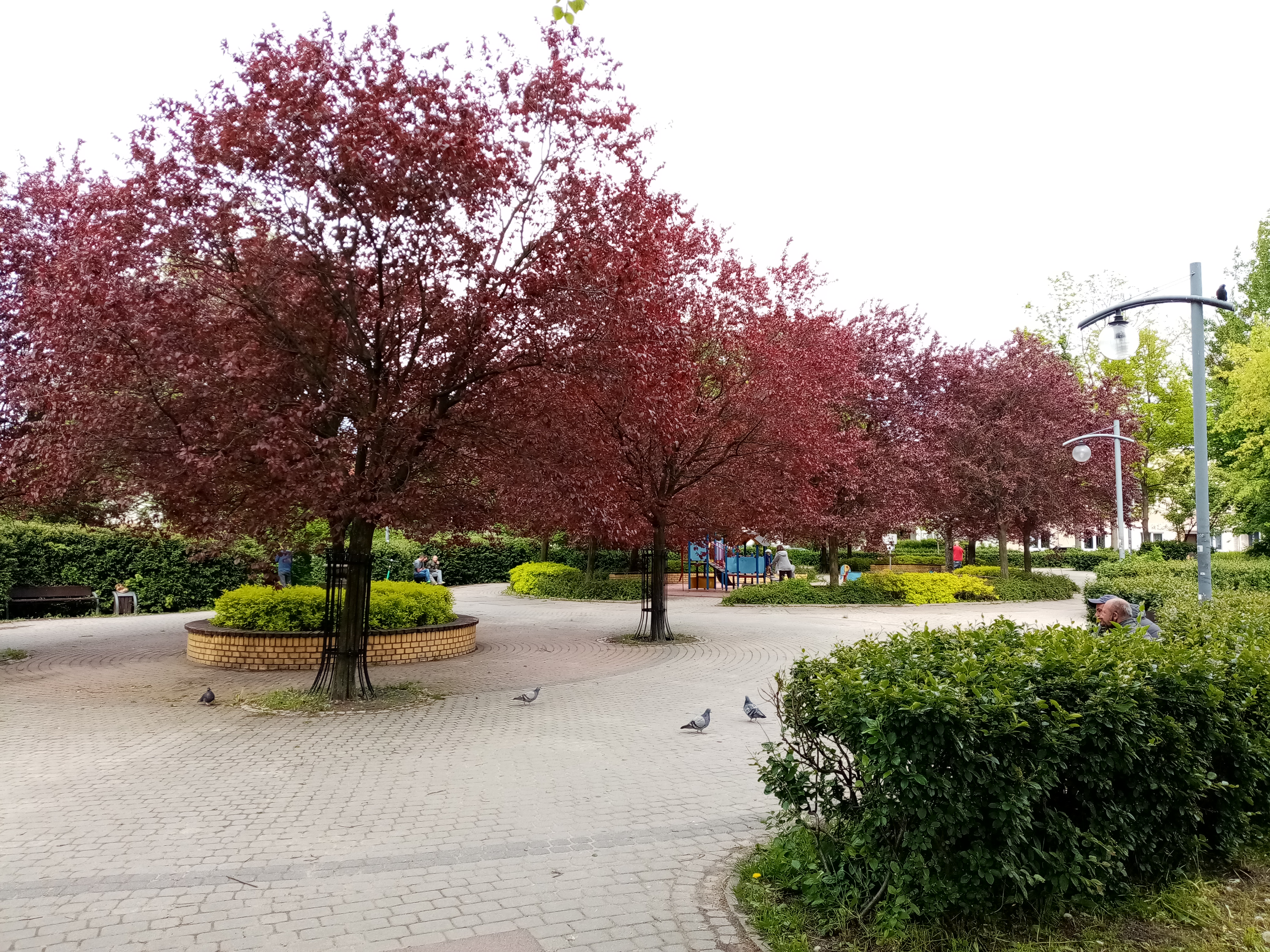
The Castellan Square, dating to the 1930s.

Since 1867, the area was part of the municipality of Blizne. On 25 March 1938, a village assembly (Polish: gromada) of Jelonki, with the seat in Miasto Ogród Jelonek, was founded as a subdivision of the municipality. After the war, the village also became the seat of the municipal government. In 1947, the village was connected with Warsaw, via the bus route W, between the Wola tram depot and the Castellan Square.

In 1943, the Schneiders family donated 28 hectares of their land to the municipality, for the symbolic price of 1 złoty, for the development of streets, churches, schools, preschools, a town hall, and other objects. The land was donated for the symbolic price of 1 złoty. After the war, Miasto Ogród Jelonek became the seat of the municipal government. In 1947, the village was connected with Warsaw, via the bus route W, between the Wola tram depot at Młynarska Street and the Castellan Square. On 14 May 1951, the area was incorporated into the city of Warsaw, becoming part of the Wola district. On 29 December 1989, following an administrative reform in the city, it became part of the municipality of Warsaw-Wola, and on 25 March 1994, its area was divided between municipalities of Warsaw-Bemowo and Warsaw-Wola, which, on 27 October 2002, was restructured into the city districts of Bemowo and Wola.

In 1949, the Warszawa Główna Towarowa railway station for cargo trains was opened at to the south of Jelonki and Połczyńska Streets. In 1952, the Warszawa Jelonki railway station was established near the corner of Strąkowska and Wincentego Pola Streets.

In 1958, association football club Robotniczy Klub Sportowy Świt merged with club Ludowy Klub Sportowy Lech Jelonki, which played on the pitch at Połczyńska Street. In 1960, the club again merged with Dąb Jelonki, taking over its pitch at 12 Oświatowa Street. In the following years, it was acquired by the Warsaw Gasworks, with most of the players being its employees, and renamed to Gazowniczy Klub Sportowy Świt Warszawa. Later, it became a property of PGNiG.

In 1968, the Church of the Exaltation of the Holy Cross, belonging to the Catholic denomination, was built in Jelonki at 31 Brygadzistów Street.

In 1974, the Wola Heating Plant was opened at 21 Połczyńska Street, as part of the city's heat network.

Between 1974 and 1977, the housing estates of Górczewska and Jelonki, consisting of high-rise apartment buildings, were built between northeastern and southwestern part of Stare Jelonki, dividing the neighbourhood into two parts.

Since 1987, the Schneider Villa at 59 Połczyńska Street, houses the Warsaw Wola Pentecostal Church.

In 1992, a tram line tracks were constructed alongside Powstańców Śląskich, and Połczyńska Streets.

== Overview ==
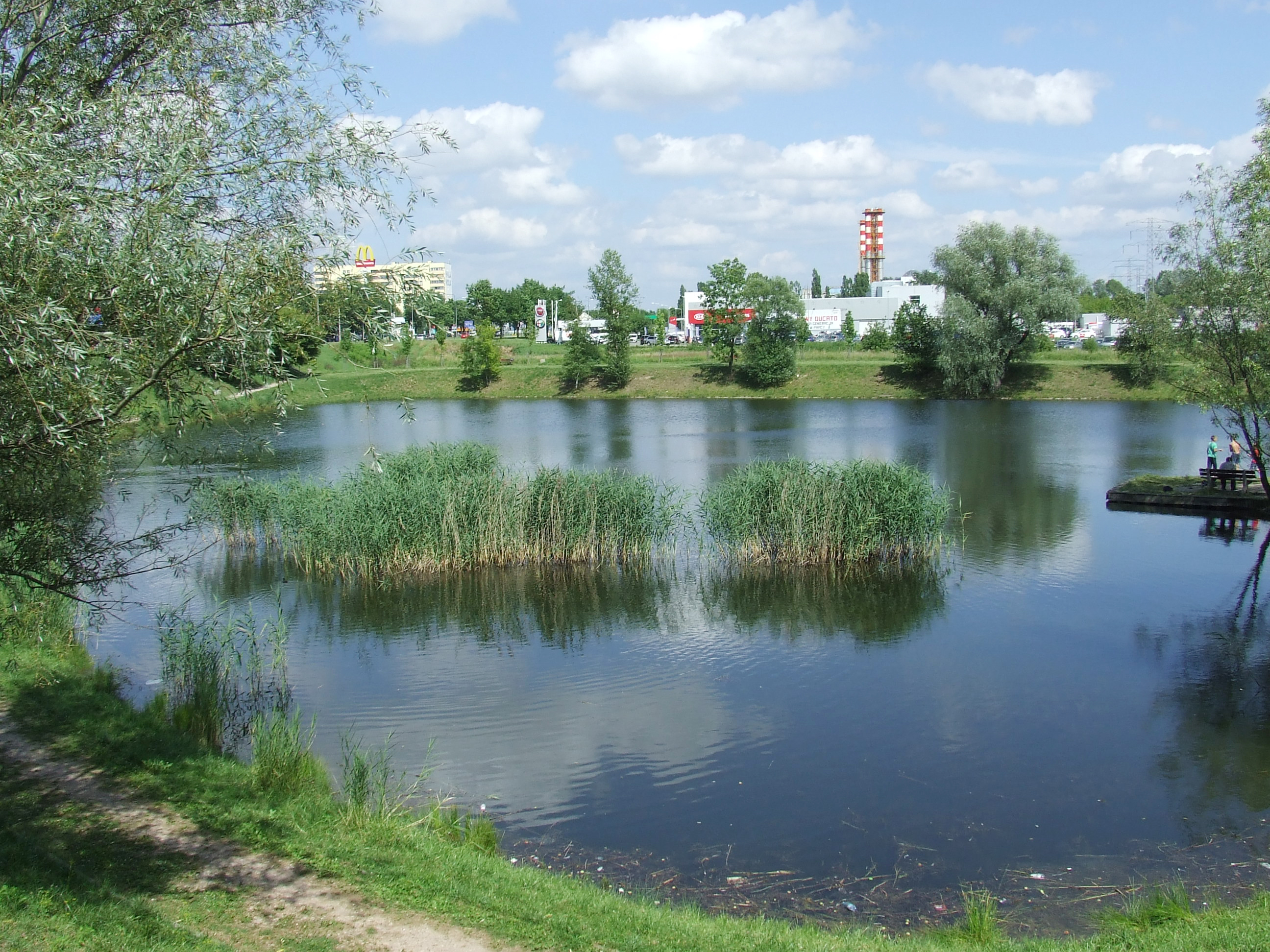
The Schneider Clay Pits, a small pond near Połczyńska Street.

Stare Jelonki consists of two separated residential areas featuring low-rise single-family housing with detached and semi-detached houses, and small tenements. Its southwest portion is placed approximately between Cokołowa, Brygadzistów, Sternicza, Powstańców Śląskich, Fortuny, Fortuny, and Drzeworytników Streets. Its northeastern part is located between Olbrachta, Znana, Czułchowska, and Powstańców Śląskich Streets. They are separated by high-rise housing estates of Górczewska and Jelonki. The nothewest part of the neighbourhood includes the Castellan Square, placed at the corner of Powstańców Śląskich and Strąkowska Streets.

Among historic and notable buildings, the neighbourhood includes the Schneider Villa, a wooden villa at 9 Połczyńska Street, dating to 1902, which used to be the residence of the Schneider family, which owned the settlement in the 19th and early 20th centuries. Currently, it houses the Warsaw Wola Pentecostal Church, housed in the historic Schneider Villa, at 59 Połczyńska Street. Stare Jelonki also has the Exaltation of the Holy Cross at 31 Brygadzistów Street, which belongs to the Catholic denomination. Additionally, the neighbourhood includes the homefield of the association football club Gazowniczy Klub Sportowy Świt Warszawa, placed at 12 Oświatowa Street, and with 140 seats.

Stare Jelonki has two railway stations, the Warszawa Główna Towarowa for cargo trains near Połczyńska Street, and Warszawa Jelonki for passenger trains, near the corner of Strąkowska and Wincentego Pola Streets. The neighbourhood also includes the tracks of the tram line network, alongside Powstańców Śląskich, and Połczyńska Streets.

The neighbourhood also have three man-made ponds, in the area of Połczyńska Street, known as Jelonek and Schneider Clay Pits. They were formed in the 20th century, from flooded clay pits.

The Wola Heating Plant, which forms part of the city's heat network, is also present near the neighbourhood, at 21 Połczyńska Street.
