= Odolan (given name) =

Male given name

Odolan (Polish: [ɔˈdɔ.lan]; alternative forms: Odolen Polish: [ɔˈdɔ.lɛn], Odylen Polish: [ɔˈdɘ̟.lɛn]) is a Polish male given name, used from 11th to 15th centuries.

== Etymology ==
The name has two proposed etymologies. First, it comes from the name of the plant valerian, which historically was known in Polish language as odolan (in modern language it is known as kozłek lekarski). The second etymology points that the name came from (now obsolete) Polish word "[p]odołać", which meant to resist or to defeat.

== Legacy ==
The name stopped being used in the 15th century. However, it had influenced a few geographical names, including Odolany, a neighbourhood in the city of Warsaw, Poland, and Odolanów, a town in Greater Poland Voivodeship, Poland.

== Notable people with this name ==
- Odolan, 12th-century nobleman
