= Jelonki Południowe =

Neighbourhood in Warsaw, Poland

- City Information System area (neighbourhood)
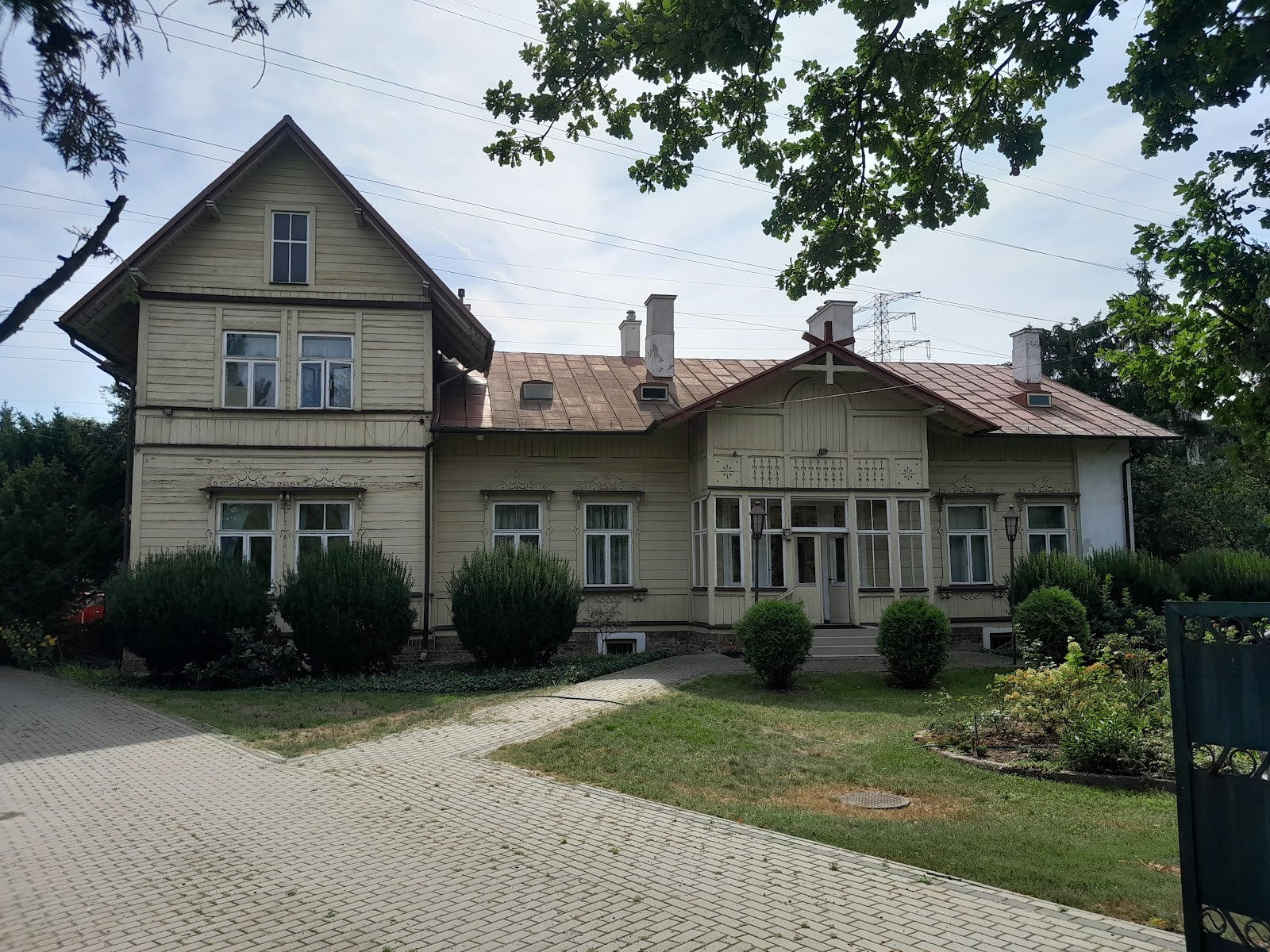
- The Schneider Villa at 59 Połczyńska Street, a historic building dating to 1902.
- Interactive map of Jelonki Południowe
- Coordinates: 52.222515°N 20.907139°E
- Country: Poland
- Voivodeship: Masovian
- City county: Warsaw
- District: Bemowo
- Time zone: UTC+1 (CET)
  - Summer (DST): UTC+2 (CEST)
- Area code: +48 22

Jelonki Południowe (Polish: [jɛ.lɔŋˈki pɔ.wudˈɲɔ.vɛ]; lit. 'South Jelonki') is a neighbourhood, and a City Information System area, in the Bemowo district of Warsaw, Poland. It is a mixed residential area with low-rise singlefamily neighbourhoods of Stare Jelonki and Nowy Chrzanów, and the high-rise multifamily housing estate of Jelonki, and Lazurowa. It forms the southern portion of the area of Jelonki.

Jelonki was founded in the 19th century as a small farming community. In the 1920s, its land was partitioned, and the village was developed as a garden suburb. It was incorporated into Warsaw in 1951. In the 1970s, the housing estates of Jelonki, and Lazurowa, were constructed.

== Toponomy ==
The name Jelonki is a Polish plural diminutive form of the term meaning cervus, a genus of deer which was present in the area. Południowe in its name translates to south, referring to it being the southern portion of the area of Jelonki.

== History ==
=== Founding and development ===
A small farming community, later known as Jelonki, was established in the area in the 19th century, next to the village of Odolany, to the north of the Poznań Road (now Połczyńska Street). The village was bought by Bogumił Schneider, a businessman, who moved to the area from Westphalia. In the second half of the century, he built his residence in the form of a brick manor house, near the current Fortuny Street. In 1902, he also built a second residence, a wooden villa at the current 59 Połczyńska Street, which stands to this day. In 1904, the village had 729 inhabitants and included 19 houses and a school. After the purchase, the village began being known as Jelonki and Jelonek.

In 1846, the Bogumił Schneider Brickworks and Roof Tiles Factory (Polish: Zakłady Cegielniane i Fabryka Dachówek „Bogumił Schneider”), in the area, which produced bricks, roof tiles, and ceramics. The factory had a good reputation, being locally known for the good quality of its products. Many houses and tenements in Warsaw were built from its bricks. It was also commissioned by the Imperial Russian Army, to provide materials for the construction of Forts II, III, and IV of the Warsaw Fortress, a series of fortifications built around the city between 1883 and 1890. It extracted the clay for its products locally, leaving behind pits, some of which were later flooded, forming small ponds, including Jelonek and Schneider Clay Pits, which are present within the neighbourhood boundaries to the present day. The factory operated until 1940, when, while under German occupation, it was ordered to be closed down.

Around 1877, fifteen German settlers founded a hamlet of Nowy Chrzanów, located along the current Okrętowa Street.

In 1927, inspired by the garden city movement, the Schneider family divided and sold a portion of their land, promoting the construction of villas and gardens in the village. They also founded a garden and a fruit tree orchard, located around their summer residence, and drew plans of wide town streets, including Schneider Avenue, which currently forms Powstańców Śląskich Street. In 1932, the settlement had been renamed to Miasto-Ogród Jelonek (Garden Town of Jelonek).

=== Second World War ===
Jelonki and Nowy Chrzanów were captured by German forces in early September 1939 during the siege of Warsaw in the Second World War. On 18 September 1939, they were recaptured in a counter-offensive by the 360th Infantry Regiment of the Polish Armed Forces, commanded by lieutenant colonel Leopold Okulicki. Their forces included four infantry companies, with heavy machine gun platoons, and one mortar platoon. They were also supported by a artillery batteries, a platoon of 7TP light tanks, as well as a company of the Capital Battalion, with the latter being pushed back during the attacks. The motorized platoon suffered heavy loses in an encounter against German Panzer 35(t) light tanks. The villages were captured with severe losses suffered by the Polish infantry, and remained under Polish control until the capitulation of Warsaw on 28 September 1939.

In 1943, Jelonki had 3,826 inhabitants.

=== Expansion as a suburb ===
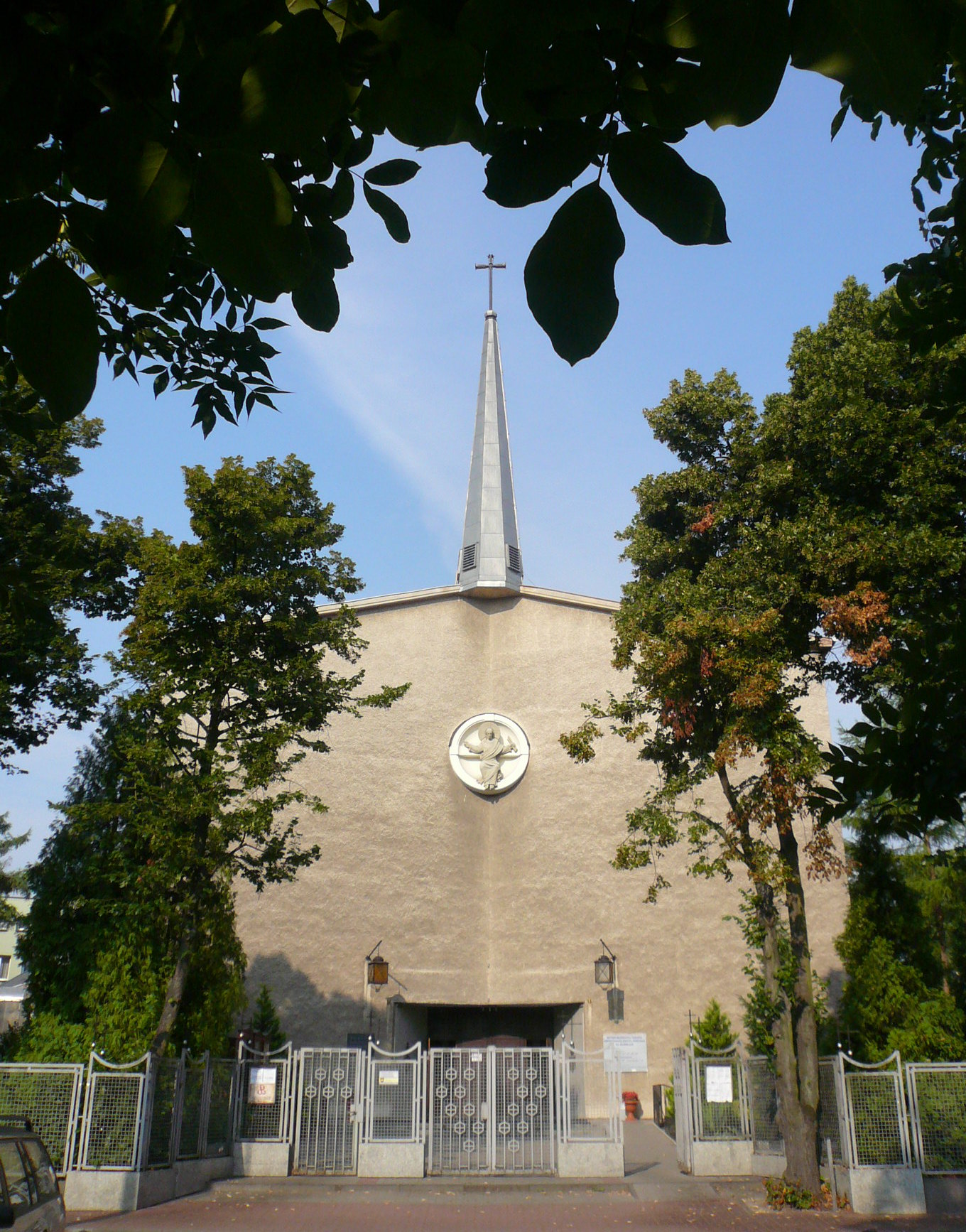
The Church of the Exaltation of the Holy Cross, built in 1968.

Since 1867, the area was part of the municipality of Blizne. On 25 March 1938, a village assembly (Polish: gromada) of Jelonki, with the seat in Miasto Ogród Jelonek, was founded as a subdivision of the municipality. After the war, the village also became the seat of the municipal government. In 1947, the village was connected with Warsaw, via the bus route W, between the Wola tram depot and the Castellan Square.

In 1943, the Schneiders family donated 28 hectares of their land to the municipality, for the symbolic price of 1 złoty, for the development of streets, churches, schools, preschools, a town hall, and other objects. The land was donated for the symbolic price of 1 złoty. After the war, Miasto Ogród Jelonek became the seat of the municipal government. In 1947, the village was connected with Warsaw, via the bus route W, between the Wola tram depot at Młynarska Street and the Castellan Square. On 14 May 1951, the area was incorporated into the city of Warsaw, becoming part of the Wola district. On 29 December 1989, following an administrative reform in the city, it became part of the municipality of Warsaw-Wola, and on 25 March 1994, of the municipality of Warsaw-Bemowo, which, on 27 October 2002, was restructured into the city district of Bemowo. In 1997, it was subdivided into ten areas, with Jelonki Południowe, becoming one of them.

In 1949, the Warszawa Główna Towarowa railway station for cargo trains was opened at to the south of Jelonki and Połczyńska Streets.

In 1968, the Church of the Exaltation of the Holy Cross, belonging to the Catholic denomination, was built in Jelonki at 31 Brygadzistów Street.

In 1974, the Wola Heating Plant was opened at 21 Połczyńska Street, as part of the city's heat network.

Between 1974 and 1977, the housing estates of Jelonki, and Lazurowa, were developed to around the historical low-rise houses of Jelonki. They consisted and high-rise apartment buildings, constructed in the large panel system technique.

Since 1987, the Schneider Villa at 59 Połczyńska Street, houses the Warsaw Wola Pentecostal Church.

In 1992, a tram line tracks were constructed alongside Powstańców Śląskich and Połczyńska Streets.

== Overview ==
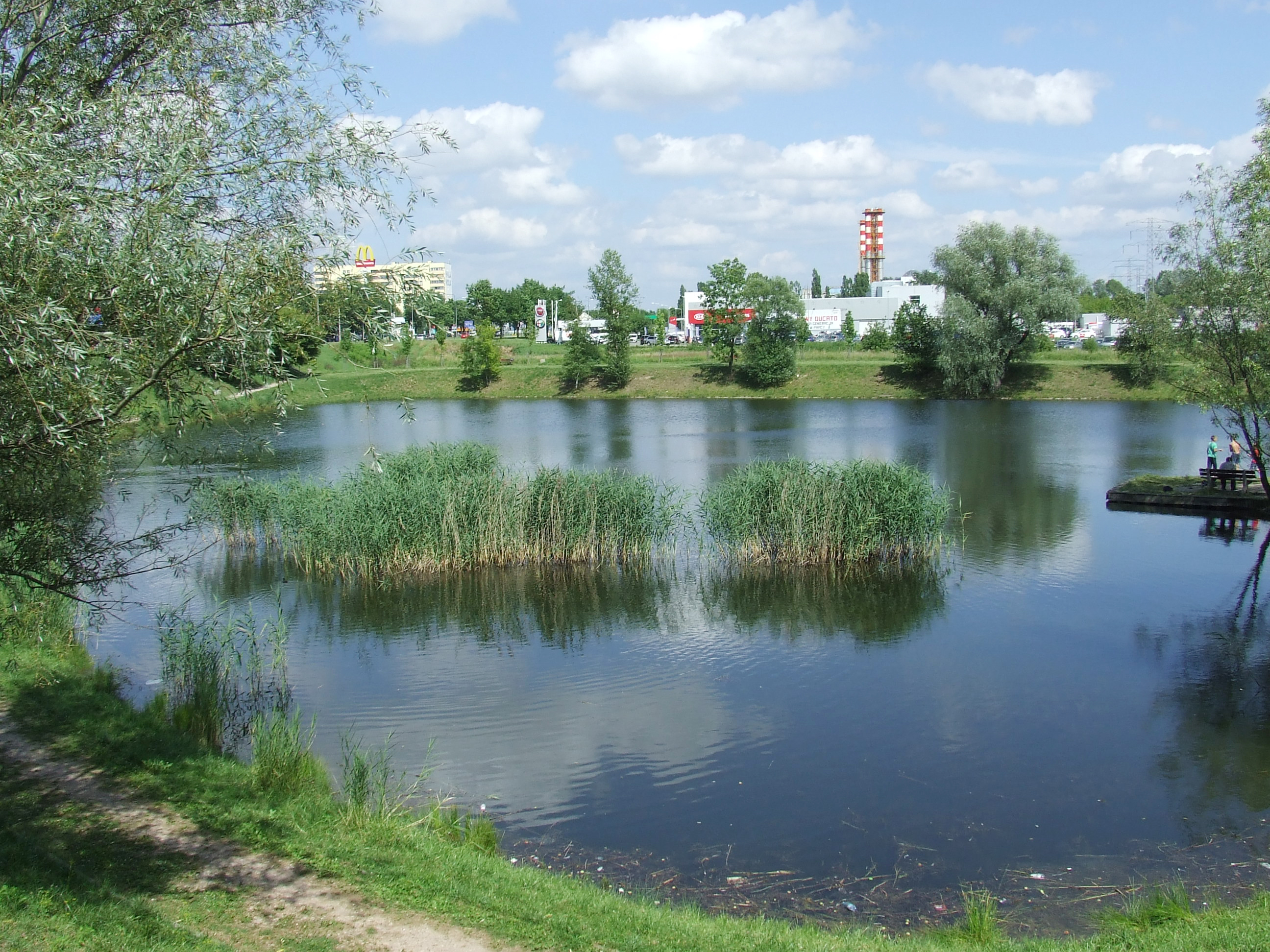
The Schneider Clay Pits, a small pond near Połczyńska Street.

Jelonki Południowe is a residential area with mixed low-rise single-family and mid- and high-rise multifamily housing. To the south of Czułchowska, it includes the neighbourhoods of Stare Jelonki and Nowy Chrzanów with detached and semi-detached houses. They are bordered by housing estates of Lazurowa to the west of Drzeworytników Street, and Jelonki to the east of Drzeworytników and Brygadzistów Streets, composed of the high-rise apartment buildings, mostly dating to the 1970s. Among historic and notable buildings, Jelonki Południowe also includes the Schneider Villa, a wooden villa at 9 Połczyńska Street, dating to 1902, which used to be the residence of the Schneider family, which owned the settlement in the 19th and early 20th centuries. Currently, it houses the Warsaw Wola Pentecostal Church. The neighbourhood also includes the Church of the Exaltation of the Holy Cross at 31 Brygadzistów Street, belonging to the Catholic denomination.

Jelonki Południowe additionally has the Warszawa Główna Towarowa for cargo trains near Połczyńska Street, and includes the tracks of the tram line network, alongside Górczewska, Powstańców Śląskich and Połczyńska Streets. It also features the Wola Heating Plant at 21 Połczyńska Street, which forms part of the city's heat network.

The neighbourhood also has three man-made ponds, known as Jelonek and Schneider Clay Pits. They were formed in the 20th century, from flooded clay pits.

== Boundaries ==
Jelonki Południowe is a City Information System area located in Warsaw, Poland, within the central portion of the district of Bemowo. Its boundaries are approximately determined by Czułchowska Street to the north; railway line no. 509, and Dzwigowa Street to the east; around the Warszawa Główna Towarowa railway station to the south; and Szegligowska Street, and Lazurowa Street to the west. It borders Jelonki Północne to the north, Odolany, and Ulrychów to the east, Nowe Włochy to the south, and Chrzanów to the west.
