= Dąbrówka Szlachecka =

Neighbourhood of Warsaw, Poland

- Neighbourhood and Municipal Information System area
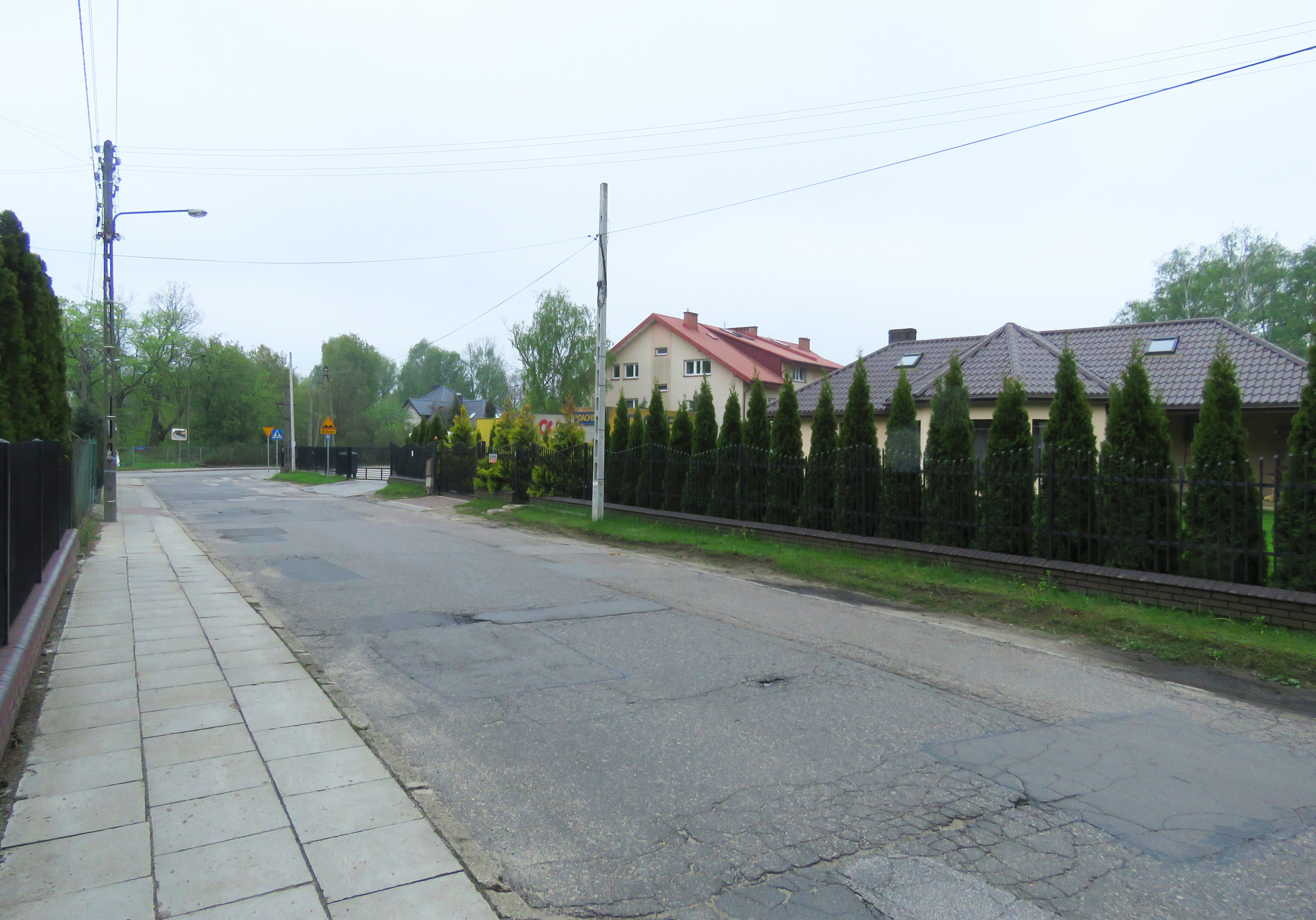
- Czeremchowa Street in Dąbrówka Szlachecka, in 2017.

- Location of Dąbrówka Szlachecka within the district of Białołęka, in accordance to the Municipal Information System.
- Coordinates: 52°20′47.11″N 20°57′28.1″E
- Country: Poland
- Voivodeship: Masovian Voivodeship
- City county: Warsaw
- District: Białołęka
- Time zone: UTC+1 (CET)
  - Summer (DST): UTC+2 (CEST)
- Area code: +48 22

Dąbrówka Szlachecka (Polish: [dɔmˈbruf.ka ʂlaˈxɛt͡s.ka]) is a neighbourhood, and an area of the Municipal Information System, in the city of Warsaw, Poland, located within the district of Białołęka.

== History ==
Dąbrówka Szlachecka was founded in 13th century, as a landed property of the local nobility, and between 16th century, it was a folwark-type settlement belonging to nearby Tarchomin.

In 20th century, Dąbrówka Szlachecka used to be a small village near the city of Warsaw. On 15 May 1951, it had been incorporated into Warsaw.
