= Nowy Chrzanów =

Neighbourhood in Warsaw, Poland

- Neighbourhood
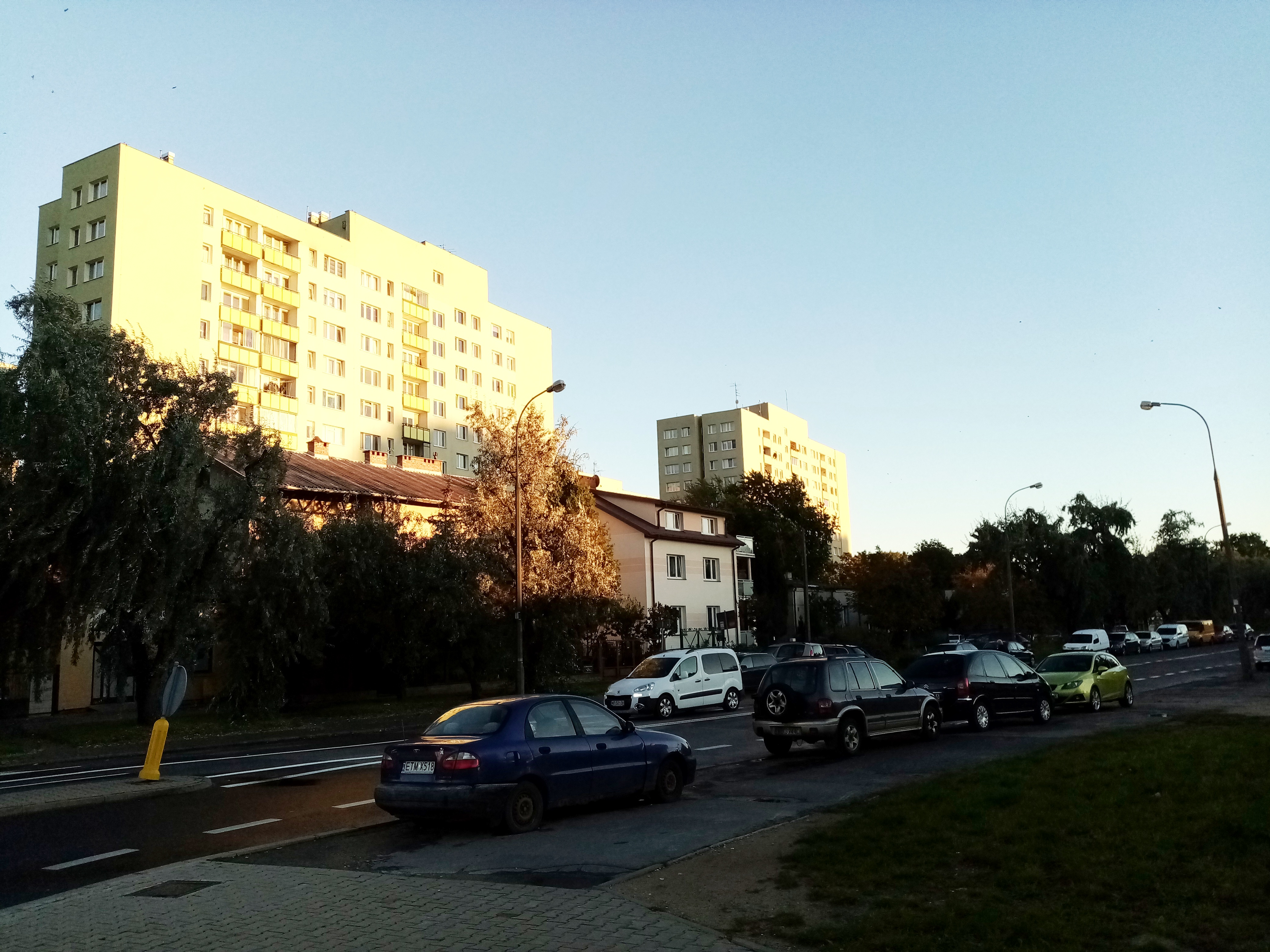
- Houses at Drzeworytników Street in 2020.
- Interactive map of Nowy Chrzanów
- Coordinates: 52.222856°N 20.903360°E
- Country: Poland
- Voivodeship: Masovian
- City and county: Warsaw
- District: Bemowo
- City Information System area: Jelonki Południowe
- Incorporation into Warsaw: 14 May 1951
- Time zone: UTC+1 (CET)
  - Summer (DST): UTC+2 (CEST)
- Area code: +48 22

Nowy Chrzanów (Polish: [ˈnɔ.vɘ̟ ˈxʂan.uf]; lit. 'New Chrzanów') is a neighbourhood in Warsaw, Poland, within the Bemowo district. It is a residential area with low-rise single-family housing, located alongside Okrętowa and Drzeworytników Streets, within the City Information System area of Jelonki Południowe. It was founded around 1877, as a small hamlet, settled by Germans, and was incorporated into the city in 1951.

== History ==
Around 1877, fifteen German settlers founded a small hamlet of Nowy Chrzanów (formerly known as Chrzanów Nowy), located along the current Okrętowa Street. It was named after the nearby Chrzanów.

Nowy Chrzanów and Jelonki were captured by German forces in early September 1939 during the siege of Warsaw in the Second World War. On 18 September 1939, they were recaptured in a counter-offensive by the 360th Infantry Regiment of the Polish Armed Forces, commanded by lieutenant colonel Leopold Okulicki. Their forces included four infantry companies, with heavy machine gun platoons, and one mortar platoon. They were also supported by a artillery batteries, a platoon of 7TP light tanks, as well as a company of the Capital Battalion, with the latter being pushed back during the attacks. The motorized platoon suffered heavy loses in an encounter against German Panzer 35(t) light tanks. The villages were captured with severe losses suffered by the Polish infantry, and remained under Polish control until the capitulation of Warsaw on 28 September 1939.

On 14 May 1951, it was incorporated into Warsaw, becoming part of the Wola district. On 29 December 1989, following an administrative reform in the city, it became part of the municipality of Warsaw-Wola, and on 25 March 1994, of the municipality of Warsaw-Bemowo, which, on 27 October 2002, was restructured into the city district of Bemowo. In 1997, the neighbourhood became part of the City Information System of Jelonki Południowe.

== Overview ==
Nowy Chrzanów is a residential area with low-rise single-family housing, located alongside Okrętowa and Drzeworytników Streets.
