= Lazurowa =

Neighbourhood in Warsaw, Poland

- Neighbourhood
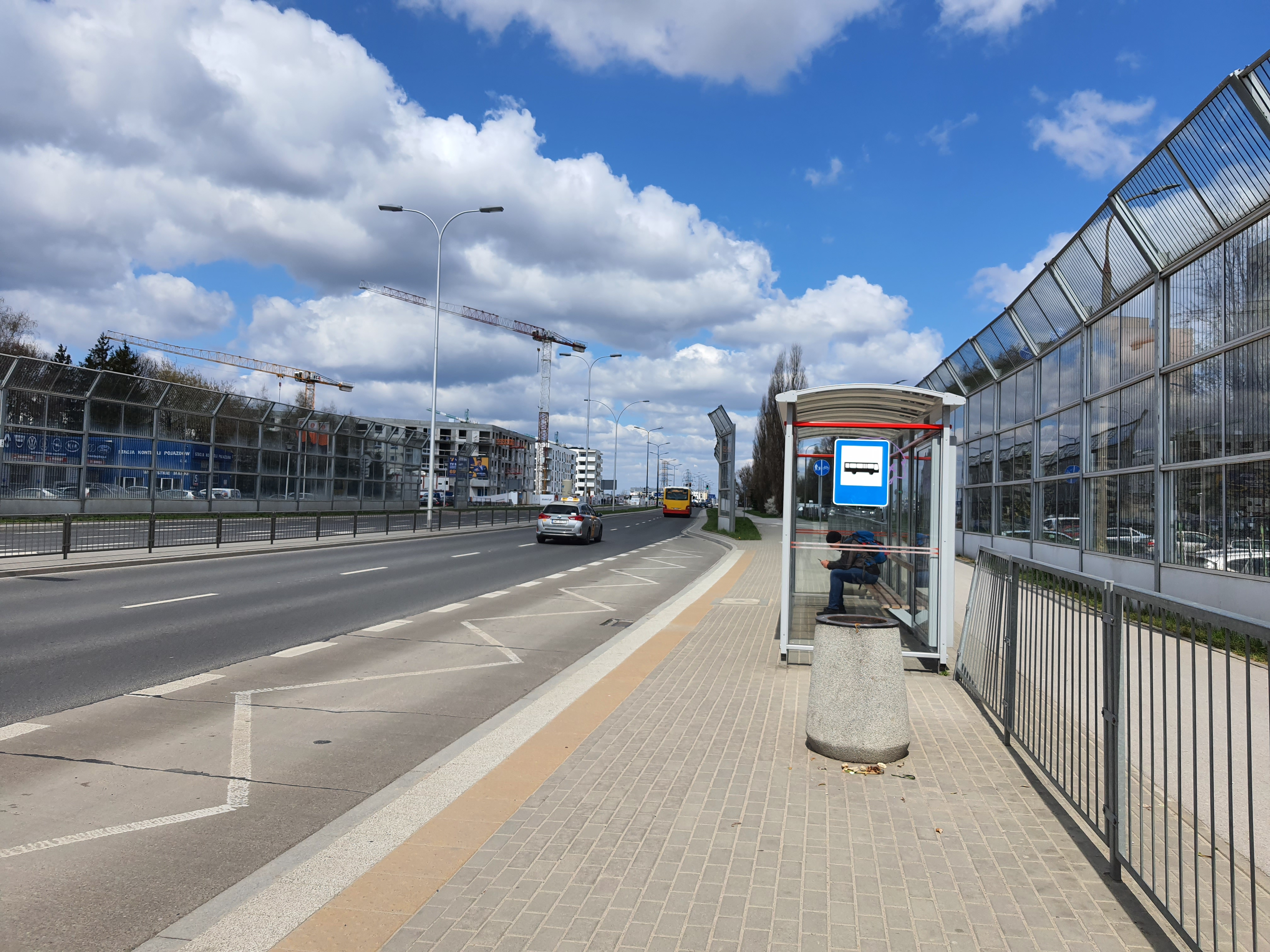
- A bus stop at the corner of Lazurowa and Sternicza Streets in 2022.
- Interactive map of Lazurowa
- Coordinates: 52.223693°N 20.899975°E
- Country: Poland
- Voivodeship: Masovian
- City county: Warsaw
- District: Bemowo
- City Information System area: Jelonki Południowe
- Established: 1978

Area
  - Total: 0.27 km^{2} (0.10 sq mi)
- Time zone: UTC+1 (CET)
  - Summer (DST): UTC+2 (CEST)
- Area code: +48 22

Lazurowa (Polish: [la.zuˈrɔ.va]) is a neighbourhood in the Bemowo district of Warsaw, Poland. It is a housing estate with high-rise apartment buildings, located between Czułchowska, Okrętowa, Sternicza, and Lazurowa Streets, within the City Information System area of Jelonki Południowe. The neighbourhood was constructed between 1975 and 1978.

== Toponomy ==
The neighbourhood is named after Lazurowa Street (Polish: Ulica Lazurowa), with its name meaning azure in Polish.

== History ==
The housing estate was designed by architect K. Stańczyk, and built between 1975 and 1978. It was developed around Górczewska Street, Powstańców Śląskich Street, Czułchowska Street, and Lazurowa Street, with high-rise apartment buildings, constructed in the large panel system technique.

== Overview ==
The neighbourhood consists of high-rise apartment buildings, constructed in the large panel system technique, placed between Czułchowska, Okrętowa, Sternicza, and Lazurowa Streets. The neighbourhood has a total area of 27 ha, and when originally opened, featured 1,600 apartments for around 8,500 inhabitants.
