= Odolan =

Odolan (d. 1145) was a Polish nobleman. During the reign of Bolesław III Krzywousty he was probably comes of Poznań or Gniezno. After his death supported his younger sons against his oldest son Władysław II Wygnaniec. Odolan was probably voivode of younger sons of Bolesław III.

== Family ==
He was a member of a noble family from Wielkopolska. His ancestor was probably Odolan, who was blinded on the order of Bolesław I Chrobry after the death of his father.

His son or grandson was Odolan (fl. 1181), cześnik of Mieszko III Stary.
