= Jelonki (housing estate) =

Neighbourhood in Warsaw, Poland

- Neighbourhood
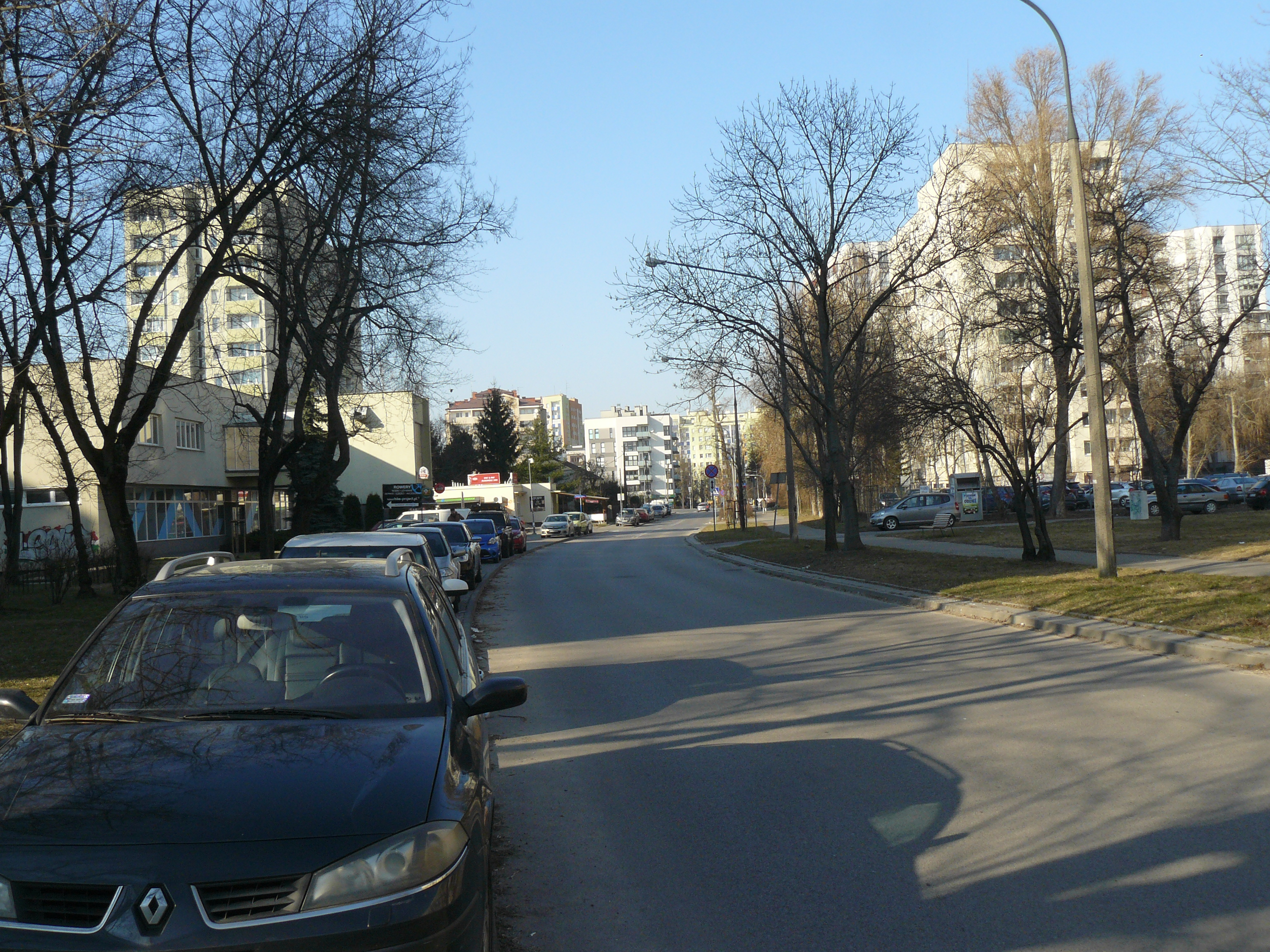
- Świetlików Street in 2022.
- Interactive map of Jelonki
- Coordinates: 52.227319°N 20.912943°E
- Country: Poland
- Voivodeship: Masovian
- City county: Warsaw
- District: Bemowo
- City Information System area: Jelonki Południowe
- Established: 1977

Area
  - Total: 0.46 km^{2} (0.18 sq mi)
- Time zone: UTC+1 (CET)
  - Summer (DST): UTC+2 (CEST)
- Area code: +48 22

Jelonki (Polish: [jɛ.lɔŋˈki]) is a neighbourhood in the Bemowo district of Warsaw, Poland. It is a housing estate with high-rise apartment buildings, located between Czułchowska, Powstańców Śląskich, Sternicza, Brygadzistów, Cokołowa, and Drzeworytników Streets, within the City Information System area of Jelonki Południowe. The neighbourhood was constructed between 1974 and 1977.

== Toponomy ==
The housing estate is named after the nearby historic neighbourhood of Jelonki, whose name is a Polish plural diminutive form of the term meaning cervus, a genus of deer.

== History ==
The housing estate was designed by architect A. Skopiński, and built between 1974 and 1977. It was developed around Czułchowska, Powstańców Śląskich, Sternicza, Brygadzistów, Cokołowa, and Drzeworytników Streets, with high-rise apartment buildings, constructed in the large panel system technique.

== Overview ==
The neighbourhood consists of high-rise apartment buildings, constructed in the large panel system technique, placed between Czułchowska, Powstańców Śląskich, Sternicza, Brygadzistów, Cokołowa, and Drzeworytników Streets. . The neighbourhood has a total area of 46 ha, and when originally opened, featured 4,400 apartments in 45 buildings, for around 15,000 inhabitants.
