= Warsaw Gasworks Museum =

Coordinates: 52°13′41″N 20°57′53″E

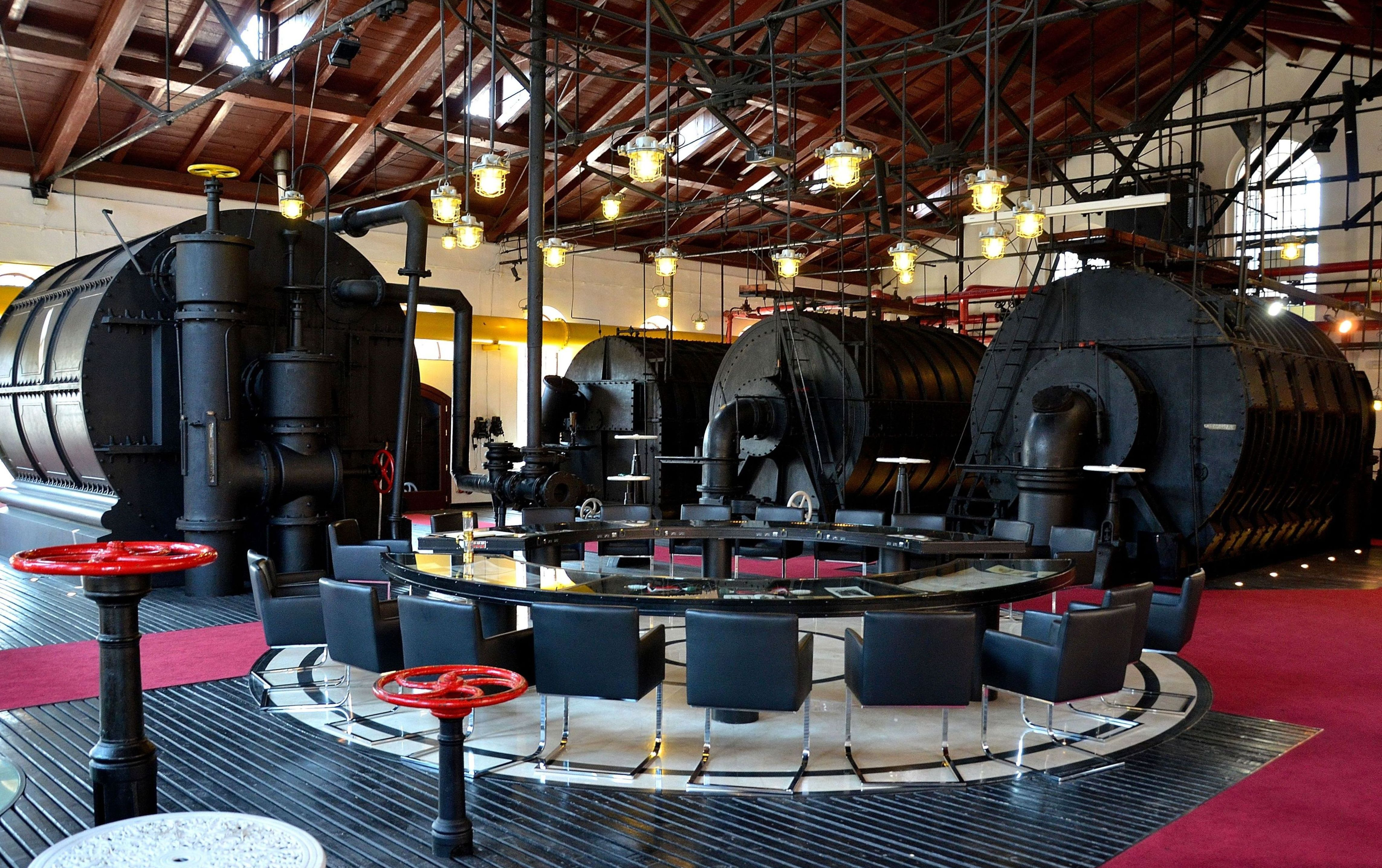
- Established: 1977
- Location: Kasprzaka 25; Warsaw, Poland
- Type: technology museum
- Website: muzeum.gazownictwa.pl

Warsaw Gasworks Museum (pol. Muzeum Gazownictwa w Warszawie) is a museum in Warsaw, Poland, located in the complex of the former Wola Gas Factory built in 1886–1888.

The museum opened in 1977. It contains various machines which were involved in the production and metering of gas, as well as gas lamps from the 19th and 20th centuries. The museum also holds a collection of historic documents related to the history of the Warsaw Gas Company.

== See also ==
- List of petroleum museums
