= Castellan Square =

Urban square in Warsaw, Poland

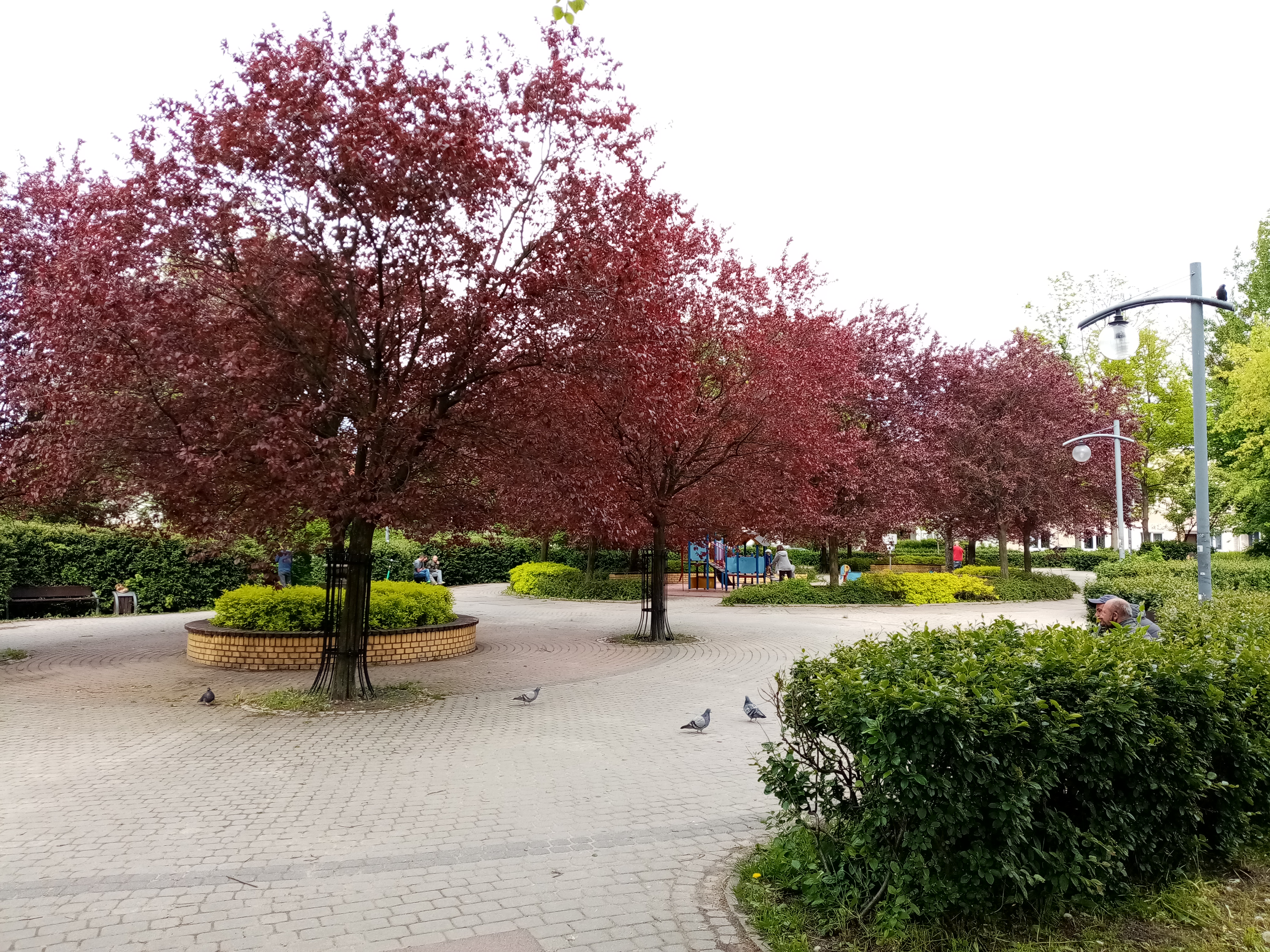
- The Japanese cherry trees at the Castellan Square.

- Location within Warsaw
- Type: Urban square
- Location: Bemowo, Warsaw, Masovian Voivodeship, Poland
- Coordinates: 52°13′54.27″N 20°54′57.29″E
- East: Gimnazjalna Street; Strąkowa Street
- West: Legendy Street; Powstańców Śląskich Street

Construction
- Completed: 1930s

The Castellan Square (Polish: Plac Kasztelański), formerly known as the John III Sobieski Square (Polish: Plac Jana III Sobieskiego), is a small urban square in the city of Warsaw in Masovian Voivodeship, Poland. It is located within the neighbourhood of Jelonki Północne in the Bemowo district, between Powstańców Śląskich, Strąkowa, Gimnazjalna, and Legendy Streets. It was built in the 1930s, and originally functioned as a marketplace.

== History ==
The Castellan Square was built in the 1930s, as part of the development of the garden suburb of Jelonki, with townhouses constructed around it. It was originally named the John III Sobieski Square (Polish: plac Jana III Sobieskiego), in the commemoration of John III Sobieski (1629–1696), the king of Poland and grand duke of Lithuania 1674 and 1696. The square originally functioned as a marketplace. From 1947 to 1949, it was the ending station of the bus line W, connecting the area with Warsaw, with the other end at the Wola tram depot at Młynarska Street. The area was incorporated into the city in 1951.

Around 2015, several Japanese cherry trees, which were gifts from the government of Japan, were planted at the square.

== Characteristics ==
The Castellan Square is a small urban square, placed between Powstańców Śląskich, Strąkowa, Gimnazjalna, and Legendy Streets, and surrounded by townhouses. It includes several Japanese cherry trees, which were gifts from the government of Japan, being planted in 2015.
