= Powązki, Warsaw West County =

Powązki
- Village
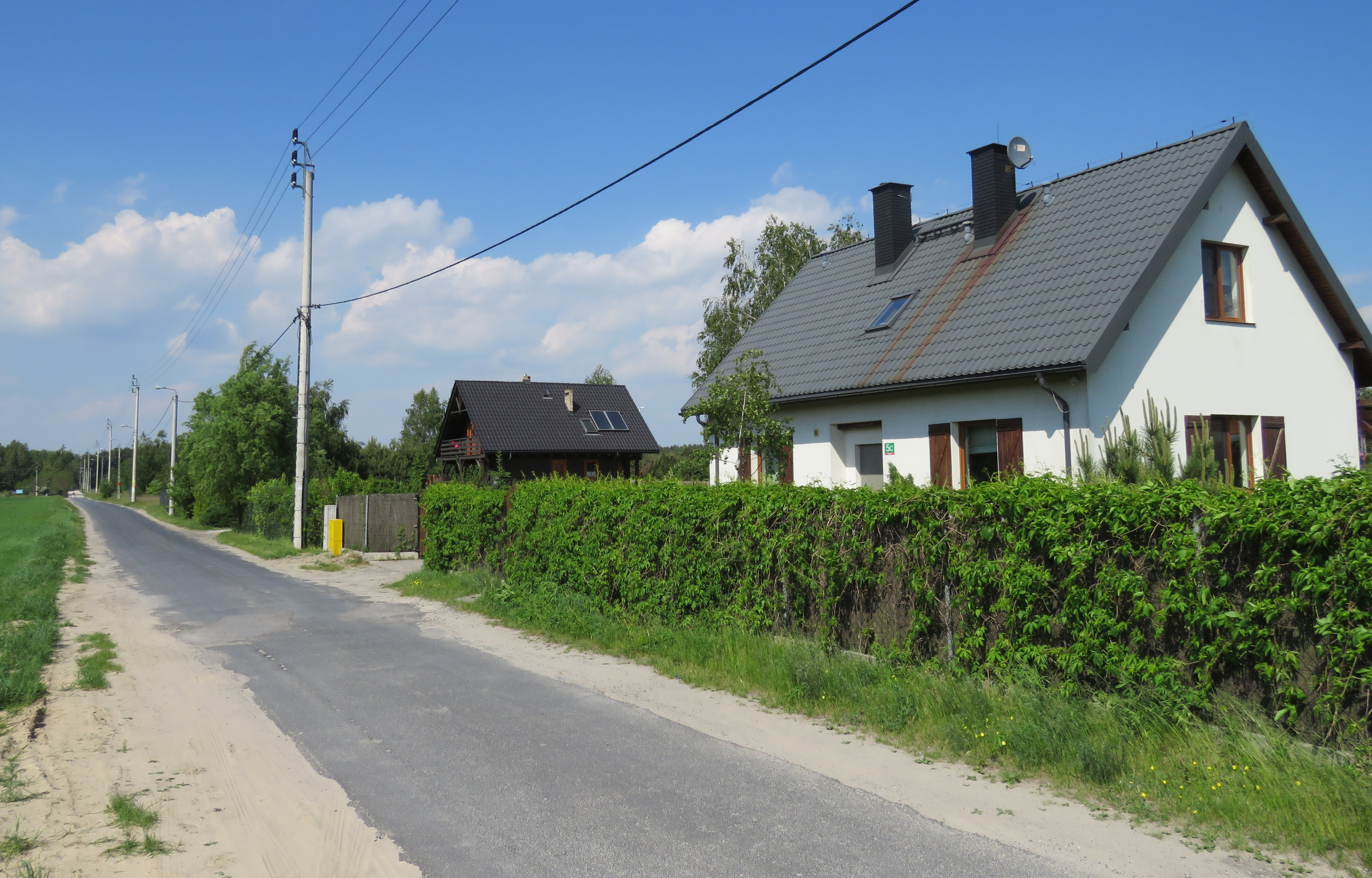
- Houses in Powązki

- Location within Poland
- Coordinates: 52°16′N 20°32′E
- Country: Poland
- Voivodeship: Masovian
- County: Warsaw West
- Gmina: Leszno

Powązki [pɔˈvɔ̃ski] is a village in the administrative district of Gmina Leszno, within Warsaw West County, Masovian Voivodeship, in east-central Poland.
