= 4th Battalion of the Military Units of the Uprising Emergency of Socialists =

Unit of the Military Units of the Uprising Emergency of Socialists

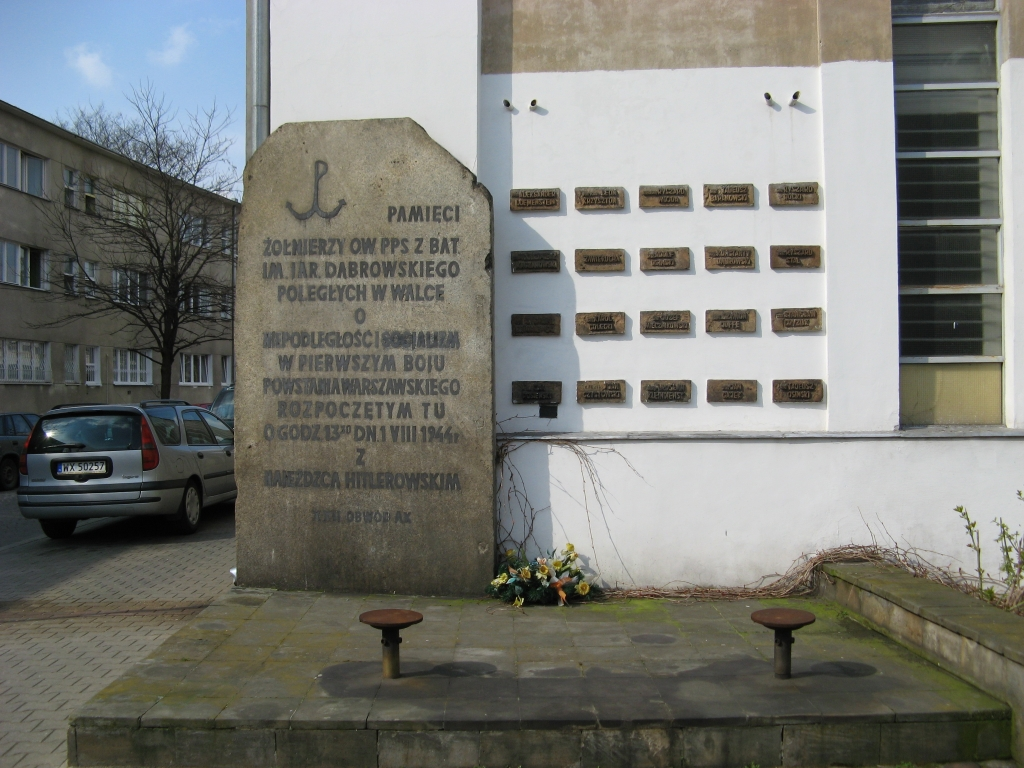
Memorial plaque commemorating the soldiers of the 4th Battalion of the Military Units of the Uprising Emergency of Socialists who fell on 1 August 1944, located at Próchnika Street, at the intersection with Suzin Street

The Jarosław Dąbrowski 4th Battalion of the Military Units of the Uprising Emergency of Socialists was a unit of the Military Units of the Uprising Emergency of Socialists operating in Żoliborz from autumn 1939 to October 1944. In early 1942, it was integrated into the Home Army within the Żoliborz Subdistrict. The battalion took part in the Warsaw Uprising and became part of the 9th Light Artillery Regiment of the 8th Infantry Division within the Warsaw Corps of the Home Army.

== History of the battalion ==
The initiative to establish a military unit of the Polish Socialist Party in Żoliborz emerged in the second half of October 1939. The commander and organizer was Roman Dąbrowski, codenamed Stary. At the beginning of 1940, the nucleus of the unit included, besides Dąbrowski: Kazimierz Skrętkowski, codenamed Krótki, Józef Deptuła, Henryk Zmorzyński, Tadeusz Patynowski, codenamed Tadeusz, Wacław Rakowski, codenamed Dąb, and Kazimierz Rurka, codenamed Długi.

Initially, the unit was organized under the three-person cell system. A squad consisted of three riflemen plus a squad leader, a platoon had 12 riflemen and three squad leaders plus a platoon commander, and a company was made up of three platoons of 13 soldiers each, plus three commanders and a company commander. By mid-1940, the unit had about 60 soldiers. At that time, it adopted the name of the 4th Battalion of the Polish Socialist Party People's Guard, named after Jarosław Dąbrowski.

In 1942, during the incorporation of the unit into the Union of Armed Struggle, it transitioned to a five-person cell system. A section consisted of five soldiers plus a section leader, a squad had 18 soldiers, a platoon had 60, and a company had 180 soldiers. However, according to Stefan Wyleżyński's account, companies at that time did not exceed 100 soldiers.

The role of organizing commander was held by Second Lieutenant Roman Dąbrowski, codenamed Stary, who also served as head of the military department of the Polish Socialist Party's Żoliborz District. The military commander was Reserve Lieutenant Józef Mikulski, codenamed Antoni. Initially, the battalion chief and armament officer was Lieutenant Kazimierz Werner, codenamed Hel, and from January 1944, Second Lieutenant Zygmunt Grudniewski, codenamed Zając. There was also an intelligence unit, led by Corporal Cadet Officer Andrzej Czystowski, codenamed Czarny, and a distribution unit, led by Jan Wólczyński, codenamed Lis. The battalion's logistics were managed by Władysław Walendziuk, codenamed Rzeźnicki, while the security platoon was commanded by Adam Pietrzak, codenamed Adam.

As of October 1941, the battalion was organized as follows:

- 1st Company – Commander: Sergeant Tadeusz Patynowski, codenamed Tadeusz; Armament NCO: Stefan Kośla.
- 2nd Company – Commander: Second Lieutenant Jan Zaliwski, codenamed Jan; Company Chief: Witold Lichaczewski; Armament NCO: Stanisław Wasilewski, codenamed Oleś (from 1943).
- 3rd Company – Commander: Second Lieutenant Aleksander Loewenstein, codenamed Borowicz; Company Chief: Corporal Cadet Officer Andrzej Czystowski, codenamed Czarny; Armament NCO: Corporal Henryk Bagiński, codenamed Bez.
- 4th Company – Commander: Sergeant Marian Kukielewski; Company Chief: Henryk Zabłocki, codenamed Zygmunt; Armament NCO: Tadeusz Baranowski, codenamed Jeremi.

After the battalion was incorporated into the structures of the Home Army between January and February 1942, it became one of the main forces in Sector IV (Powązki), alongside the skeletal platoon and Kmicic Company. The companies were reorganized into Home Army platoons numbered 218, 219, 220, and 221. Despite the fact that the companies were effectively platoons, efforts were made to increase their numbers to actual company size. According to Stefan Wyleżyński, this was achieved for the 2nd Company, which was subsequently divided into Platoon 221/I (63 soldiers) and Platoon 221/II (45 soldiers). The first platoon (221/I) was commanded by Lieutenant Jan Zaliwski, while the second (221/II) was under Wyleżyński himself, Corporal Cadet Officer Stefan Wyleżyński, codenamed Lemiesz. Meanwhile, Henryk Kaczor noted that the increase in numbers actually affected the 3rd Company, which, in January 1944, became Platoon 219. However, due to arrests and organizational shortcomings, Platoon 219 disbanded. The 3rd Company grew large enough that two new platoons were formed from its ranks: 220/I and 220/II. Additionally, a new Platoon 219 (49 soldiers) was established from the former 3rd Company and designated as the 2nd Company.

In early January 1943, under orders from the commander of the Żoliborz Subdistrict, Lieutenant Colonel Mieczysław Niedzielski, codenamed Sadownik, the battalion command took possession of 50 Česká Zbrojovka pistols intended for the General Jewish Labour Bund forces in the Warsaw Ghetto. The operation was overseen by the battalion's armament officer, Lieutenant Kazimierz Werner, codenamed Hel. Along with the assigned weapons, the battalion contributed from its own supplies an additional 50 Filipinka grenades and 30 kg of TNT. The transport to the ghetto was carried out by a squad from the 2nd Company, with security provided by the Polish Socialist Party Militia from the Tram Depot at Muranowska Street. The weapons were handed over through the basements of Długa Street (in the section before the Royal Arsenal).

== Order of battle – 1 August 1944 ==
Before the uprising, the battalion was part of the I Group of Sector IV of the Żoliborz Subdistrict. The commander of the district was Captain Kazimierz Nowacki, codenames Szkodnik, Żyrafa:

- Command of the I Group (IV Battalion):
  - Commander – Second Lieutenant Roman Dąbrowski, codenamed Stary
  - Deputy – Reserve Second Lieutenant, M.A. Józef Mikulski, codenamed Antoni Ster
- 1st Company of Walery Wróblewski:
  - Commander – Reserve Second Lieutenant Tadeusz Juliusz Zaliwski, codenamed Jan
  - Deputy – Corporal Cadet Officer Kujawski, codenamed Kujawa
    - Platoon 218 – Sergeant Tadeusz Patynowski, codenamed Tadeusz
    - Platoon 221 – Corporal Marian Kukiełko-Kukielewski, codenamed Lewski
- 2nd Company of the Paris Commune:
  - Commander – Reserve Second Lieutenant Aleksander Loewenstein, codenamed Borowicz
  - Deputy – Corporal Cadet Officer Leon Krzysztoń, codenamed Bogdan
    - Platoon 219/I – Reserve Second Lieutenant Zygmunt Grudniewski, codenamed Zając
    - Platoon 219/II – Corporal Cadet Officer Stefan Jerzy Wyleżyński, codenamed Lemiesz
    - Platoon 220 – Corporal Cadet Officer Witold Zbrożyna, codenamed Kacper
- Military Women's Service Platoon of the Military Units of the Uprising Emergency of Socialists:
  - Commander – Joanna Hertz-Lowenstein, codenamed Joanna

As of 31 July, the battalion had 330 soldiers, including: 13 officers, 20 cadet officers, 49 non-commissioned officers, 173 rank-and-file soldiers, and 75 women from the 4th Military Women's Service Platoon of the Military Units of the Uprising Emergency of Socialists. This represented 36% of Sector IV's strength. According to Stanisław Podlewski, the battalion was equipped with: 1 heavy machine gun, 2 light machine guns, 32 rifles, about 30 pistols, and several hundred grenades. Other reports suggest that the weapons were enough for 65 soldiers, which accounted for 23% of the battalion's strength. In addition to the Military Units of the Uprising Emergency of Socialists Battalion, the 4th Company of the Polish Socialist Party Militia operated in Żoliborz under the command of Teodor Zieliński, codenamed Teodor (with deputies: Witold Lichaczewski, codenamed Witek, and Henryk Ciszewski). The Militia Company had 3 pistols before the uprising.

== Warsaw Uprising ==
The task of the group, along with the Kmicic Company (platoons 240, 241, 242) from the II Group, was to carry out the main assault on Fort Bema from the side of Lasek na Kole forest, under the cover of a steam locomotive from the Warszawa Gdańska railway station. If the steam locomotive was unavailable, the sappers from platoons 219 and 220 were to neutralize the crews of the bunkers with the help of explosives and blow up the gate to the fort. After eliminating the soldiers and obtaining weapons, the fort was to be abandoned, and then actions along Mickiewicz and Marymoncka streets were to be initiated to support the district's units.

The planned concentration point for the Military Units of the Uprising Emergency of Socialists units was to be in private houses and stables in the Miasteczko-Powązki area, opposite the Powązki Military Cemetery. However, on 28 July, the Germans placed a military hospital in the private houses across from the cemetery and brought in the wounded. This prevented the concentration of units in that area. Therefore, it was decided to move the concentration point to the boiler room of the VI Colony of the Warsaw Housing Estate at Suzin Street. From there, the first wave of units was to move through the Powder Factory and garden plots to the railway siding track connecting Warszawa Gdańska railway station with Palmiry. They were then to pass through the buildings of the Kościuszko colony and head to Miasteczko-Powązki.

=== Outbreak of the uprising ===
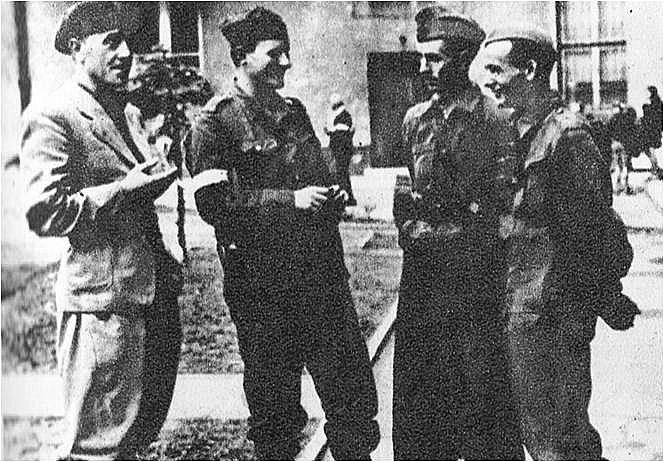
Officers of the Żyrafa Group: Captain Eugeniusz Śliwiński, codenamed Jurand, Lieutenant Marian Merenholc, codenamed Wiktor, Second Lieutenant Marek Różycki, codenamed Rola, Second Lieutenant Janusz Sitek, codenamed Janusz

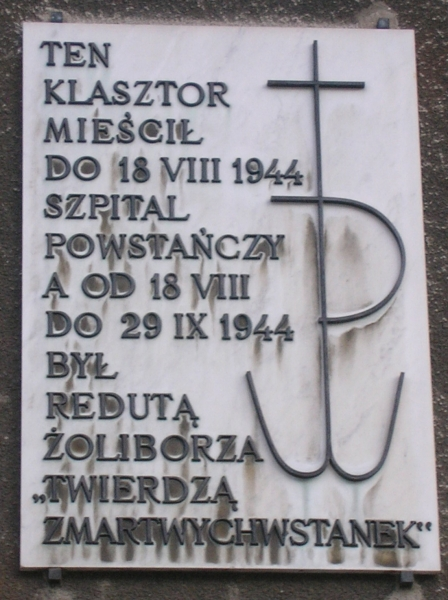
Plaque on the wall of the Sisters of the Resurrection Convent in Warsaw

The battalion command received the order for the uprising on 1 August at 10:00 AM, and by 12:30 PM, the concentration of units was completed. Meanwhile, at 2:00 PM, a skirmish occurred on Krasiński Street between a group of soldiers from the Żniwiarz Group and a German patrol during the transfer of weapons. This led to a German raid an hour later. Through the windows of the boiler room, the Germans noticed the Military Units of the Uprising Emergency of Socialists soldiers. An attempt to throw a grenade into the boiler room was stopped by a covering group under the command of Corporal Cadet Aleksander Ostrowski, codenamed Feliks. A fight broke out with the German units. After the action initiated by the covering group, Lieutenant Loewenstein, codenamed Borwicz, issued an order to leave the boiler room. As the insurgents were leaving the building, they were shot at from the corner of the Fourth Colony, and while running from Suzin Street to Sierpecka Street, they came under fire from a machine gun. At that moment, the first soldier of the unit, Corporal Cadet Lech Krzysztoń, codenamed Bogdan (deputy commander of the company), was killed, and Corporal Aleksander Ostrowski, codenamed Feliks, was wounded. They continued to withdraw to the old gunpowder factory plots but were shot at again. Then, Second Lieutenant Grudniewski, codenamed Zając, ordered the division into two groups. The covering group under the command of Second Lieutenant Aleksander Loewenstein, codenamed Borowicz, was to stay behind as protection, while the rest of the unit, with the battalion commander, was to retreat toward the Health Center on Słowacki Street.

At the corner of Słowacki and Potocka streets, the battalion soldiers encountered a German infantry unit supported by two tanks, while a German line infantry was approaching from the direction of Wilson Square. In an effort to avoid a confrontation with the superior enemy forces, the Military Units of the Uprising Emergency of Socialists soldiers turned onto Gdańska Street, where they came under fire from the building of the Gas School. The enemy fire caused significant casualties. The following soldiers were killed: Private Mieczysław Joffe, codenamed Maślak, Second Lieutenant Włodzimierz Kaczanowski, codenamed Włodek (according to S. Wyleżyński, Kaczanowski fell right near the exit of the boiler room), Corporal Cadet Ryszard Wojda, codenamed Biały, Private Karol Golecki, codenamed Papkin, Private Jan Rosieński, Senior Private Tadeusz Baranowski, codenamed Jeremi. Second Lieutenant Zygmunt Grudziński, codenamed Zając, was severely wounded.

The unit was saved from destruction by the soldiers of the third company from the third district of Bielany, who, after allowing the insurgents to pass, opened fire on the enemy. Meanwhile, a few minutes after the first unit withdrew, the battalion's covering group reached Harcerska Street, where it attacked a group of German soldiers, capturing weapons and ammunition. It then moved toward Marymoncka Street. There, under fire, the group took up positions in the foundations of one of the houses. The Germans, supported by armored weapons, broke into the house, completely dismantling the group. According to the account of Andrzej Czystowski, the fight took place in the allotment gardens on Drużbacka Street, where the following soldiers were killed while defending until their ammunition was exhausted: Lieutenant Aleksander Loewenstein, codenamed Borowicz, Private Zawierucha, Corporal Cadet Jan Czystowski, codenamed Stary II, Senior Private Tadeusz Osiński, Private Adolf Osiński, Private Józef Miecznikowski, codenamed Figus, Private Ryszard Rocki, codenamed Królik. The wounded were finished off by the Germans. On the first day of the uprising, the battalion suffered 17 killed and 11 wounded, was scattered, and could not carry out its assigned tasks.

Around 10:30 PM, a significant portion of the soldiers of the second district, under the command of Captain Kazimierz Nowacki, codenamed Żyrafa, along with most of the district's units, set out toward Kampinos Forest. Along with them, part of the second batch of the battalion (about 80 soldiers) withdrew. According to another version, the second 150-man batch, under the command of Corporal Cadet Stefan Wyleżyński, codenamed Lemiesza, armed with one rifle, two pistols, and 30 grenades, broke through to 2 Gdańska Street and lay down under enemy fire. During the night, this unit withdrew to Kampinos Forest.

In the Żoliborz area, the remaining soldiers of the scattered first batch of the platoons, as well as part of the second batch, began to organize in several locations. The Military Units of the Uprising Emergency of Socialists soldiers, together with volunteers, the Polish Socialist Party Militia, and escaped Dutch workers, began building their center of resistance by erecting barricades on Krasiński, Suzin, and Słowacki streets. In front of St. Stanislaus Kostka Church, they placed two machine guns. Second Lieutenant Marek Różycki, codenamed Rola, joined with eight soldiers. In the evening of 2 August, they secured the block at 16 Krasiński Street and partially secured 3 Suzin Street. On 3 August, Platoon 219 secured Henkel Square and the streets Niegolewski, Wieniawski, Kochowski, and Krasiński, as well as the exits from Wieniawski and Brodziński streets.

=== Żyrafa Group ===
On the night of 4 to 5 August, the Żoliborz units of Żywiciel returned to the district. By order of 5 August, the Żoliborz units were reorganized into five groups. The Military Units of the Uprising Emergency of Socialists unit became part of the Żyrafa Group, under the command of Lieutenant Ryszard Wołczyński, codenamed Tatar. The group remained in the previous area, occupying residential blocks at 16, 18, and 20 Krasiński Street. Its tasks included patrolling the villa district and Wojska Polskiego Avenue along its western edge, as well as conducting reconnaissance of German forces at the Chemical Institute and in Buraków. The group was primarily composed of the Military Units of the Uprising Emergency of Socialists and the recreated platoon 234. Lieutenant Dąbrowski, codenamed Stary, took the position of deputy commander of the group, while Corporal Cadet Wyleżyński, codenamed Lemiesz, became the group's weapons officer.

On this day, the group had 129 soldiers (including 6 officers, 3 cadets, 18 non-commissioned officers, and 102 soldiers). According to another version, the battalion had about 250 people.

On 5 August, the battalion also underwent reorganization:

- First company – commander Lieutenant Tadeusz Zaliwski, codenamed Jan;
  - Platoon 221 – commander Sergeant Marian Kukielewski, codenamed Lewski;
  - Platoon 218 – Sergeant Tadeusz Patynowski, codenamed Tadeusz (according to another version, Second Lieutenant Marceli Truszewski, codenamed Misiewicz);
- Second company – commander Second Lieutenant Marian Mehrenholc, codenamed Wiktor; deputy commander – Second Lieutenant Maksymilian Górny, codenamed Tytus (according to another version, Tytus was the deputy commander of the first company);
  - Platoon 219 – Second Lieutenant Marek Różycki, codenamed Rola;
  - Platoon 220 – Senior Sergeant Stanisław Błaszczak, codenamed Chętny.

On 5 August, during the German attack on the barricade on Krasiński Street, two soldiers from Platoon 219 stood out: Sergeant Marian Kuligowski, codenamed Listek, and Corporal/Senior Sergeant Ryszard Pawłowski, codenamed Krysik. They eliminated the crew of a heavy machine gun and were awarded the Cross of Valour for their actions.

From 5 August, the Biuletyn IV Okręgu PPS began being published, edited by Antoni Zdanowski. From issue 31, the publication was titled Biuletyn IV Okręgu PPS i OW PPS. The publication, with a circulation of around 500 copies, was distributed among the Military Units of the Uprising Emergency of Socialists soldiers, the Polish Socialist Party Militia, block committees, and house committees. It was printed on the mimeograph machine of the IV Battalion's publishing section. The collaborators of the publication included Helena Syrkus, Andrzej Nowicki, and Robert Frohlich, codenamed Góral (the Żoliborz district head). At the same time, the Polish Socialist Party Militia organized a Security Guard precinct, covering the area from Wilson Square to Gdańska Street. The Militia Company had between 50 and 60 people armed with 11 pistols.

On 18 August, a German company attacked the insurgent positions on Wyspiański Street from the direction of the Chemical Institute. The defending unit, consisting of 24 soldiers armed with 4 rifles, could not withstand the attack and retreated toward Henkel Square. Several members of the unit were killed or wounded. The attack was stopped by the Military Units of the Uprising Emergency of Socialists company. After three hours, the Germans were driven back to their previous positions.

=== Defense of the Resurrection Fortress and southern Żoliborz ===
On 22 August, the units underwent reorganization. The Żbik Group was dissolved, and the Żyrafa II Group was formed. The previous Żyrafa Group, which included the Military Units of the Uprising Emergency of Socialists companies, was renamed Żyrafa I. Platoon 260, led by Second Lieutenant Marian Sitek, codenamed Janusz, was incorporated into the second company, coming from Kampinos Forest.

From 22 August, the first company of the Military Units of the Uprising Emergency of Socialists took control of the Sisters of the Resurrection Convent, known as the Resurrection Fortress, and became the core of its defense.

After 20 September, the Żoliborz units were reorganized into the 8th Infantry Division of the Home Army, named after Romuald Traugutt. The Żyrafa Group, including the Military Units of the Uprising Emergency of Socialists, was transformed into the 8th Light Artillery Regiment of the Home Army, with Major Kazimierz Nowacki, codenamed Żyrafa, becoming its commander.

On 27 September, the Germans sent envoys (Polish citizens, including former Prime Minister Antoni Ponikowski) with a call for immediate surrender, which was rejected by Colonel Żywiciel. On the morning of 28 September, the German forces began their attack on the insurgent positions. The first company of the Military Units of the Uprising Emergency of Socialists defended the convent, while the second company held the corner of Wojska Polskiego Avenue at its intersection with Stołeczna and Wyspiański streets. A People's Army unit worked together with the Military Units of the Uprising Emergency of Socialists in a building at Brodziński Street.

The following morning, the Germans, supported by armored vehicles, managed to break through the weak barricades blocking Kozietulski, Brodziński, and Wyspiański streets and pushed the People's Army unit of Captain Jan Szaniawski, codenamed Szwed, back towards the Church of Saint Stanislaus on Niegolewski Street. This allowed the Germans to infiltrate the rear of the second company of the Military Units of the Uprising Emergency of Socialists. However, thanks to the immediate reaction of Lieutenant Marian Merenholc, codenamed Wiktor, who set up a defense and called for reinforcements, the enemy's attack was slowed down. During the fighting in the ruins of Kozietulski Street, Platoon Commander Second Lieutenant Marek Różycki, codenamed Rola, was killed. The Military Units of the Uprising Emergency of Socialists retreated to Henkel Square. Reinforcements from Second Lieutenant Andrzej Rudnicki, codenamed Następa, enabled a regrouping and stopped the enemy's advance. The units held their positions at Henkel Square, the northern part of Wyspiański Street, and Trętowski Street. Around 6:00 PM, the second company withdrew to the block at 20 Krasińskiego Street. By 8:00 PM, the Germans had taken control of the block bounded by Wojska Polskiego Avenue, Kozietulski, and Krasiński streets up to Stołeczna Street.

On the same day at 8:00 AM, after an artillery bombardment, the Germans, covered by tanks, infiltrated the Sisters of the Resurrection Convent, taking the ground floor. They were driven out of the building by an attack from Platoon 218, led by Second Lieutenant Marceli Truszewski, codenamed Misiewicz. At 11:00 AM, 14 bombers conducted a raid on the convent, and subsequent attacks led to the building being set on fire by flamethrowers. Due to the risk of being cut off from the rest of the units, Lieutenant Jan Zaliwski, codenamed Jan, ordered the evacuation of the wounded and withdrew the remnants of the first company from the monastery's ruins. A small group of about a dozen soldiers, led by Sergeant Marian Kukielewski, codenamed Lewski, fought until 8:15 PM, at which point they were taken prisoner. According to Juliusz Kulesza's findings, the first company lost 22 killed and about 75 wounded in the fighting for the convent.

On 30 September, the Żyrafa units occupied defensive positions on the third, fifth, eighth, and ninth colonies of the Warsaw Housing Estate. According to the account of Stanisław Podlewski, there were 40 soldiers left in the first company of the Military Units of the Uprising Emergency of Socialists and 16 in the second company. In total, the group numbered about 130 soldiers. As a result of negotiations with the Red Army, the Żoliborz units were to be concentrated in the lower part of Żoliborz, aiming to hold as close as possible to the Vistula river, from where help was expected. After the regrouping in the morning hours, around 11:00 AM, the insurgents launched an attack on the Vistula embankment, where evacuation boats were supposed to wait. The route to the Vistula was to be cleared by the Żbik and Żyrafa groups (around 80 soldiers). The attack collapsed under enemy fire. Eight soldiers of the Military Units of the Uprising Emergency of Socialists were killed, including Second Lieutenant Marian Mehrenholc, codenamed Wiktor, the commander of the second company. According to another account, only nine of the 39 attacking soldiers of the Military Units of the Uprising Emergency of Socialists returned. The attack failed due to the cancellation of the crossing, which the attacking insurgents were unaware of.

On 30 September, after talks with General Bór's messenger, Colonel Karol Ziemski, codenamed Wachnowski, at around 6:30 PM, a decision was made to surrender Żoliborz. The soldiers of the Military Units of the Uprising Emergency of Socialists laid down their arms near the Feniks House.

== Decorated soldiers ==
A list of definitively identified soldiers of the battalion:

Silver Cross of the Virtuti Militari:

- Senior Sergeant Stanisław Błaszczak, codenamed Chętny (born 30 May 1898, died 4 December 1965) – a volunteer who joined on 2 August, deputy commander of Platoon 220. Awarded the Silver Cross of the Virtuti Militari (cross number 12347) on 30 September 1944 by the Żoliborz Subdistrict commander, authorized by the Home Army commander.
- Corporal Leon Gross (listed as Leon Greś in the Warsaw Rising Museum biography), codenamed Leonidas (born 29 February 1921) – squad commander in Platoon 221. Awarded the Silver Cross of the Virtuti Militari (cross number 12890) on 30 September 1944 by the Żoliborz Subdistrict commander, authorized by the Home Army commander.
- Second Lieutenant Marek Różycki (assumed name Marek Strukiński), codenamed Rola (born 21 April 1911, died 29 September 1944) – commander of Platoon 219, killed on Kozietulski Street. Awarded the Silver Cross of the Virtuti Militari (cross number 12855) on 30 September 1944 by the Żoliborz Subdistrict commander, authorized by the Home Army commander.
- Platoon Leader Ewa Ponińska, codenamed Ewa (born 27 May 1927) – liaison officer in Platoon 218. According to the Warsaw Rising Museum biography, she was part of Platoon 227. Awarded the Silver Cross of the Virtuti Militari (cross number 11685) on 30 September 1944 by the Żoliborz Subdistrict commander, authorized by the Home Army commander.

== Bibliography ==
- Jasiński, Grzegorz (2009). Żoliborz 1944. Dzieje militarne II Obwodu Okręgu Warszawa AK w Powstaniu Warszawskim [Żoliborz 1944. Military History of the 2nd District of the Warsaw Home Army Area in the Warsaw Uprising] (in Polish). Oficyna Wydawnicza "Ajaks". ISBN 978-83-62046-03-4.
- Kaczor, Henryk (1972). "Organizacja wojskowa WRN na Żoliborzu" [Military Organization of WRN in Żoliborz]. Z lat wojny i okupacji [From the Years of War and Occupation] (in Polish). Warsaw: Wydawnictwo Ministerstwa Obrony Narodowej.
- Kreusch, J.; Kunert, A. (1997). Labuszewski, T. (ed.). Wielka Ilustrowana Encyklopedia Powstania Warszawskiego [Great Illustrated Encyclopedia of the Warsaw Uprising] (in Polish).
- Kulesza, Juliusz (2010). "Żyrafa" przeciw "Panterom" ["Żyrafa" Against "Panthers"] (in Polish). Fundacja "Warszawa Walczy 1939-1945". ISBN 978-83-89205-20-9.
- Wyleżyński, Stefan (1995). "Na Żoliborzu" [In Żoliborz]. Polska Partia Socjalistyczna w latach wojny i okupacji 1939–1945 [Polish Socialist Party During the War and Occupation 1939–1945] (in Polish). ISBN 83-85618-15-5.
