= Pacification of Marymont =

Nazi crimes in Warsaw's Marymont during World War II

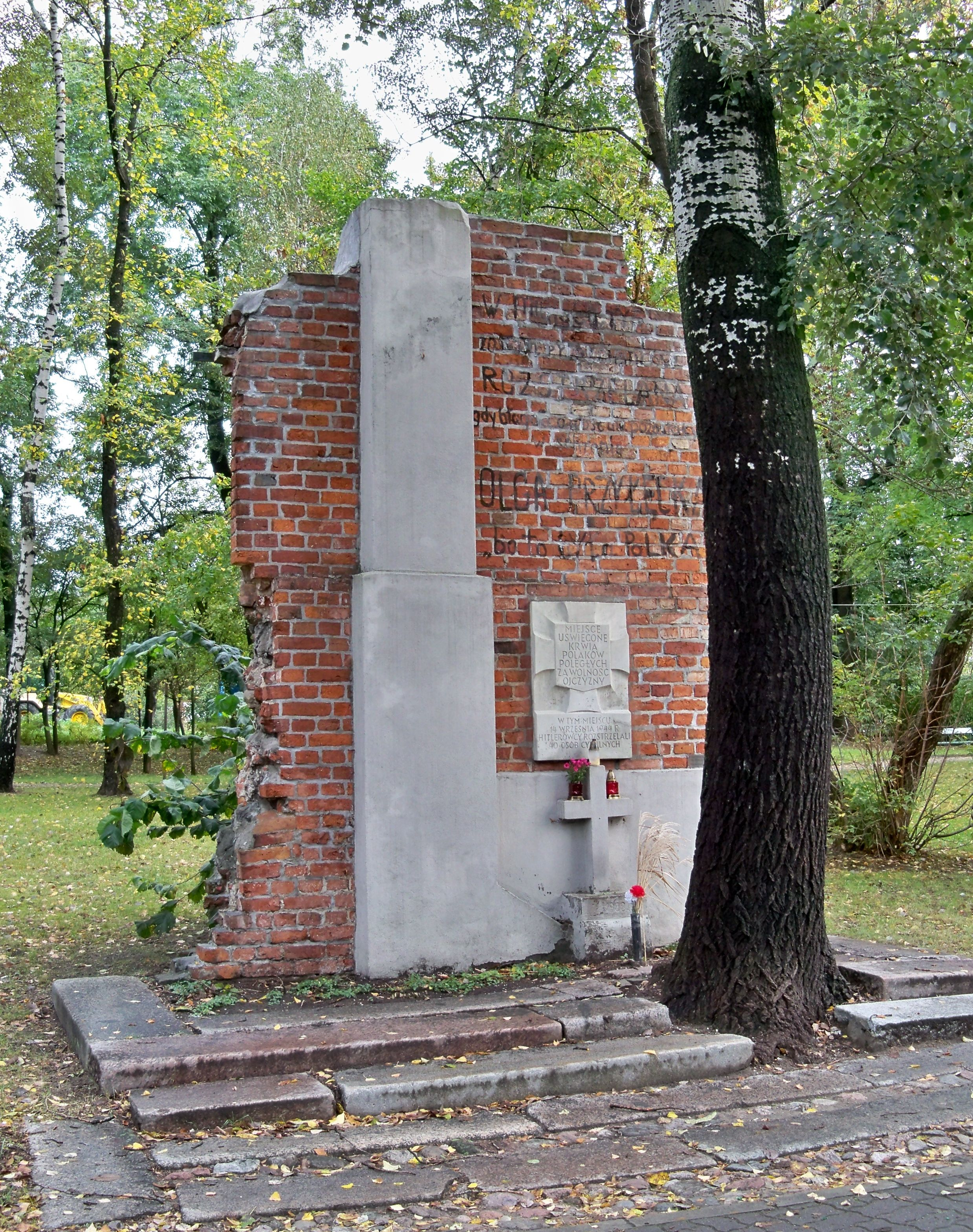
Plaque commemorating approximately 40 Marymont residents murdered near Kolektorska Street

Pacification of Marymont was a wave of murders, arson, looting, and rapes that swept through Warsaw's Marymont district during the Warsaw Uprising. On 14–15 September 1944, assaulting formations of the Wehrmacht and eastern volunteer units murdered several hundred Polish civilians, as well as many wounded and captured soldiers of the Home Army.

== Fall of Marymont ==
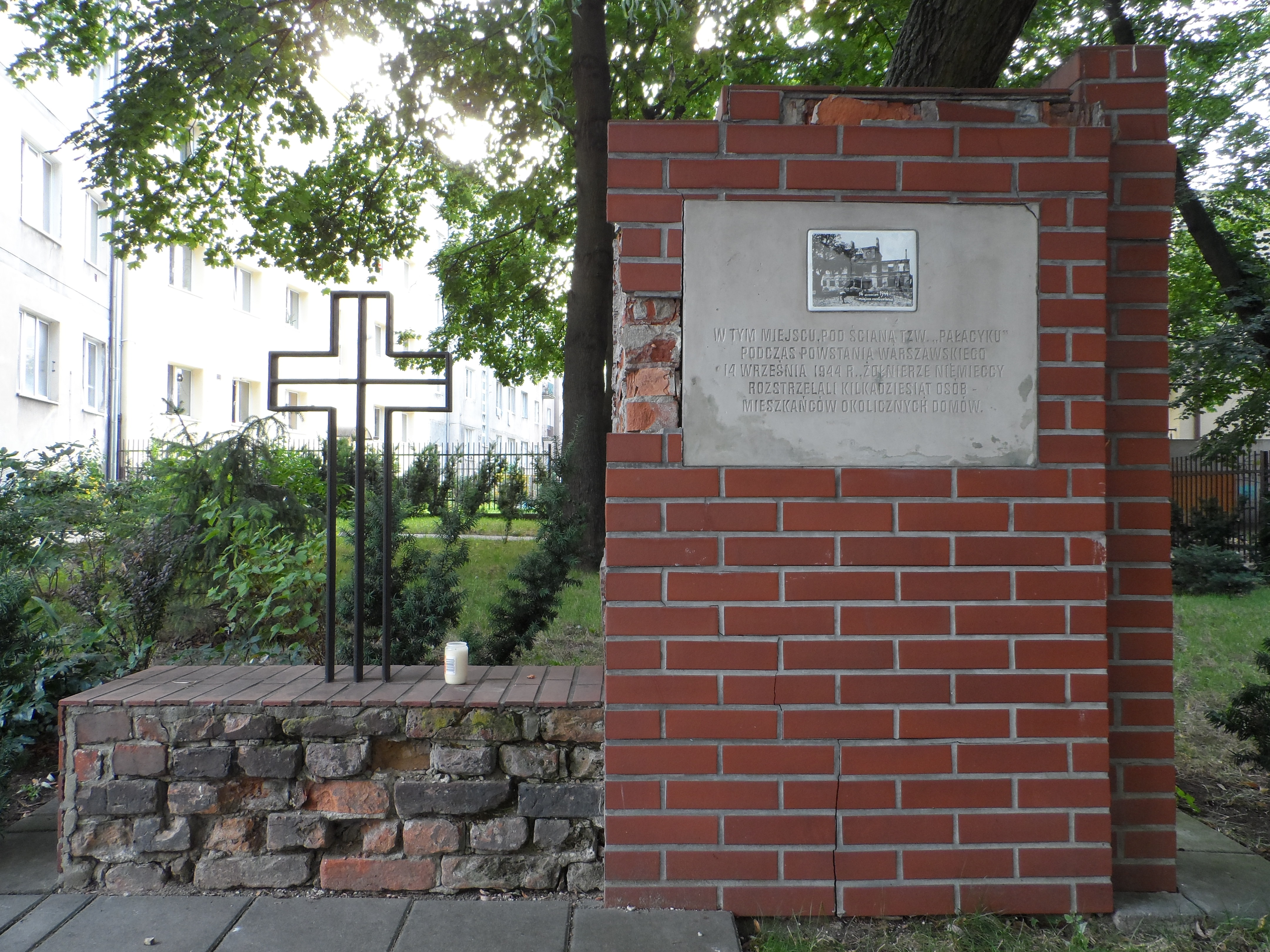
Plaque commemorating victims of executions under the wall of the Marysieńka Palace (now 2B Bieniewicka Street)

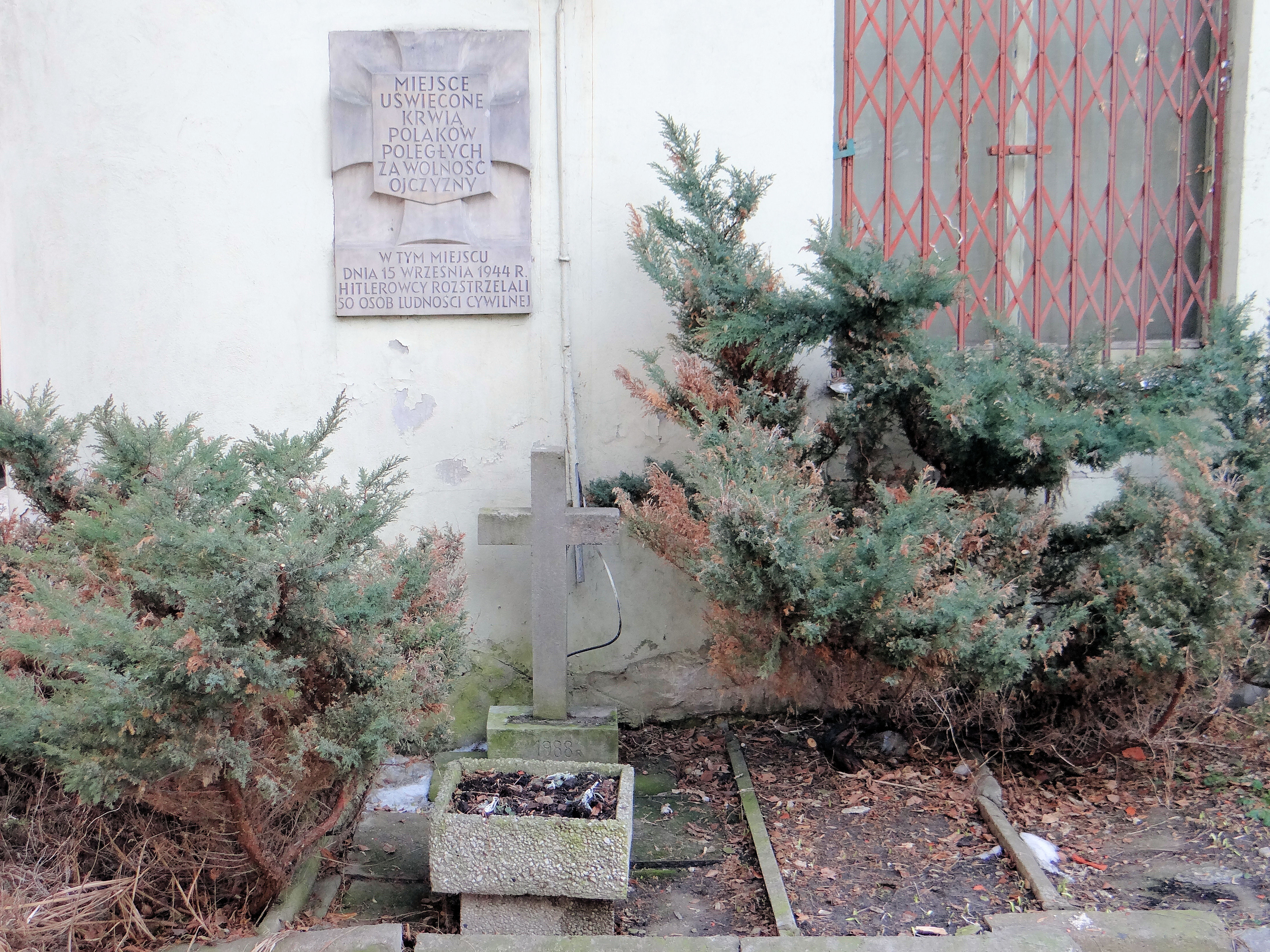
Memorial plaque at Barszczewska Street

On 22 August 1944, the Home Army's assault on Warszawa Gdańska railway station collapsed. Żoliborz, including Marymont, saw no significant combat operations thereafter. Even German artillery and Luftwaffe forces, preoccupied elsewhere in the city, rarely targeted the district. The exception was lower Marymont, a kind of "no-man's land", where frequent patrol clashes occurred. From 26 August, German units began setting fire to buildings unoccupied by insurgents. Home Army patrols resisted these arsonists, but the enemy succeeded in burning most of lower Marymont and abducting many residents. The remaining population fled to Żoliborz or stayed in surviving homes.

Thanks to the German withdrawal from outposts at the Gas School and the school on Kolektorska Street, forces under Colonel Mieczysław Niedzielski, codenamed Żywiciel, managed to gain control of nearly all of Marymont by 1 September. The following week passed without major fighting.

The Germans intensified their actions with the start of the Soviet offensive on Praga. On 13 September, the enemy began heavy shelling of Marymont, followed by an assault on its settlements the next day. After a two-hour artillery preparation, German infantry, supported by strong armored units, advanced on Marymont. The attack came from two directions – along Marymoncka and Gdańska streets, and along Kamedułów Street and the Vistula embankment toward the Warsaw Citadel. The assault involved two battalions of the 25th Panzer Division (the 25th reconnaissance unit and the 87th engineer battalion). Fierce fighting lasted nearly eight hours, ending around 8:00 PM. By that evening, the Germans had captured almost all of Marymont, including the "Olejarnia" buildings at 33 Gdańska Street and the Gas School at 6 Gdańska Street, which the Poles had seized two weeks earlier. The insurgents were forced to retreat to the line of Potocka and Elżbieta Drużbacka streets. Losses in the Home Army's Żubr and Żmija units were severe, reaching up to 30% killed and wounded. German forces also suffered significant casualties, including the commander of the 25th reconnaissance unit, two company commanders, and dozens of soldiers. The insurgents likely damaged six German armored vehicles.

== Crimes against prisoners and civilians ==
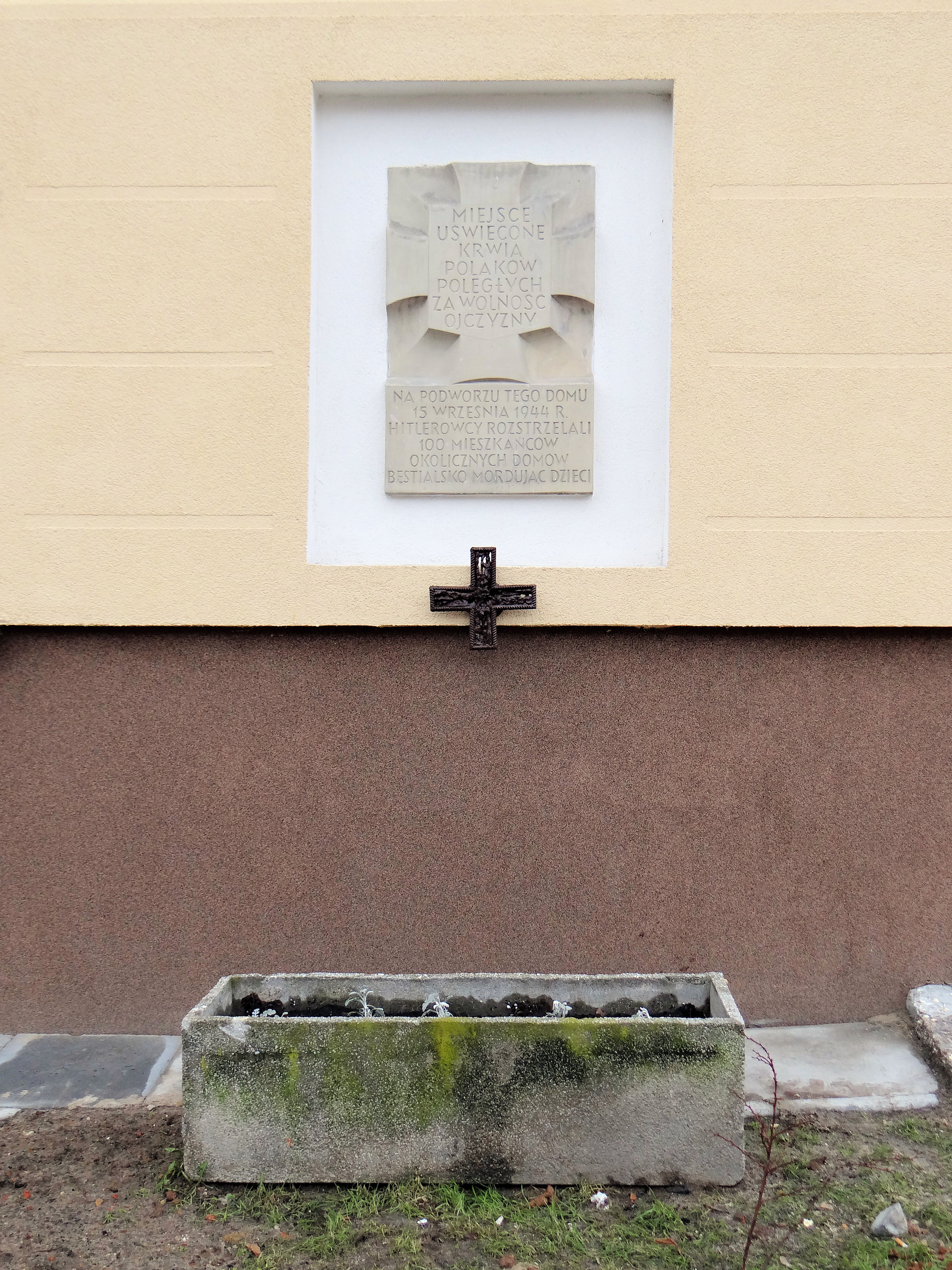
Memorial plaque at 4A Gdańska Street

On the occupied territory, German soldiers burned houses and systematically murdered civilians, including women and children. According to Polish Red Cross records, at least 363 Marymont residents were killed that day, including 25 children aged from 3 months to 14 years. Adam Borkiewicz estimated the death toll at over 500.

The pacification of Marymont followed a premeditated pattern. Germans and their eastern collaborators brutally expelled residents from homes and shelters. After searches, typically accompanied by the theft of valuables, Poles were either driven to the CIWF building in Bielany (a staging point for "selection" of captives) or executed on the spot. Mass executions took place at several locations along Maria Kazimiera Street – notably in the square in front of the so-called Marysieńka Palace, near the Marymont ponds, at the corner of Gdańska and Kaskadowa streets, and at the municipal waterworks building on Potocka Street. Victims were primarily residents of the following streets: Maria Kazimiera (about 120 victims), Dembiński (about 50 victims), Rymkiewicz (about 35 victims), Morawska (about 10 victims), Gdańska (about 10 victims), and Słowacki (several killed). Basements sheltering civilians were attacked with grenades. According to some witnesses, Germans also used civilians as "human shields", driving them ahead of their tanks.

'We were taken to the ponds and ordered to kneel (…). Ukrainians began taking jewelry and valuables from us. A young Ukrainian took groups of three or four men from our group, leading them behind a hill each time; I heard rifle shots, and he returned alone.

— testimony of Władysław Gąsiorowicz

Captain Adam Rzeszotarski, codenamed Żmija, upon finding the bodies of his mother, wife, and son in front of the Marysieńka Palace, suffered a nervous breakdown and could no longer command his unit.

Wounded and captured insurgents were also killed. In a ground-floor house at 12 Rajszewska Street, Germans used grenades and flamethrowers to murder fourteen wounded soldiers from the 224th platoon (Żmija Group) and three nurses tending them. Only two wounded survived, one being Wacław Gluth-Nowowiejski. At a field hospital on 4 Rudzka Street, they killed 20 wounded and an undetermined number of medical staff.

On 15 September, the Germans continued their assault on Marymont but, despite air support, failed to break the insurgent defense (e.g., the Opel factory buildings remained in Polish hands). They captured only the block bounded by Mickiewicz, Potocka, and Bohomolca streets and briefly displaced Captain Żubr's soldiers from houses on Gdańska and Bieniewicka streets. In the occupied houses at 4 and 4A Gdańska Street, Germans executed about 30 people, including women and children. That day, they also killed around 20 residents of Bieniewicka Street. On 16 September, Home Army soldiers recaptured 4 and 4A Gdańska Street, discovering dozens of brutally murdered civilians in the basements. The crime scene inspection report from Gdańska Street was later handed by Colonel Żywiciel to German command in response to a surrender proposal for Żoliborz.

Surviving Marymont residents were herded to the CIWF building in Bielany, where Russian-speaking collaborators committed numerous rapes. After a brief stay, the gathered population was deported to the transit camp in Pruszków.

Notably, during the Marymont fighting, crimes against prisoners and civilians were primarily committed by Wehrmacht soldiers (25th Panzer Division), with significant involvement of eastern volunteer units. This distinguishes Marymont from other Warsaw districts, where the SS and German police typically perpetrated the worst atrocities.

== Bibliography ==
- Borkiewicz, Adam (1969). Powstanie warszawskie. Zarys działań natury wojskowej [Warsaw Uprising: Outline of Military Operations] (in Polish). Warsaw: Pax.
- Datner, Szymon; Leszczyński, Kazimierz (1962). Zbrodnie okupanta w czasie powstania warszawskiego w 1944 roku (w dokumentach) [Occupier’s Crimes During the Warsaw Uprising in 1944 (in Documents)] (in Polish). Warsaw: Wydawnictwo Ministerstwa Obrony Narodowej.
- Jasiński, Grzegorz (2009). Żoliborz 1944 [Żoliborz 1944] (in Polish). Pruszków: Ajaks. ISBN 978-83-62046-03-4.
- Motyl, Maja; Rutkowski, Stanisław (1994). Powstanie Warszawskie – rejestr miejsc i faktów zbrodni [Warsaw Uprising: Register of Crime Sites and Facts] (in Polish). Warsaw: GKBZpNP-IPN.
- Sawicki, Tadeusz (2010). Rozkaz zdławić powstanie. Niemcy i ich sojusznicy w walce z powstaniem warszawskim [Order to Crush the Uprising: Germans and Their Allies in the Fight Against the Warsaw Uprising] (in Polish). Warsaw: Bellona. ISBN 978-83-11-11892-8.
- Ludność cywilna w powstaniu warszawskim [Civilians in the Warsaw Uprising] (in Polish). Vol. I. Warsaw: State Publishing Institute PIW. 1974.
