= Żmija Group =

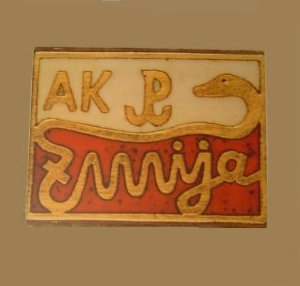
A commemorative badge of the Żmija Group.

The Żmija Group (Polish: Zgrupowanie Żmija) (Viper Group) - a group of military units of the Sub-district II of Żoliborz (of Armia Krajowa) of Armia Krajowa in Żoliborz in Warsaw during the German occupation of Poland. The units took part in the fights of the Warsaw Uprising of 1944.

== Creation ==
The group was created in 1940 when the 3rd Scout Military Unit was transformed into the 225th platoon, based in the area of Marymont of Warsaw. In the course of its training, prior to the Warsaw Uprising, many military actions were conducted, among them at the wall of the Warsaw Ghetto and in Bielany.

== Organisation ==
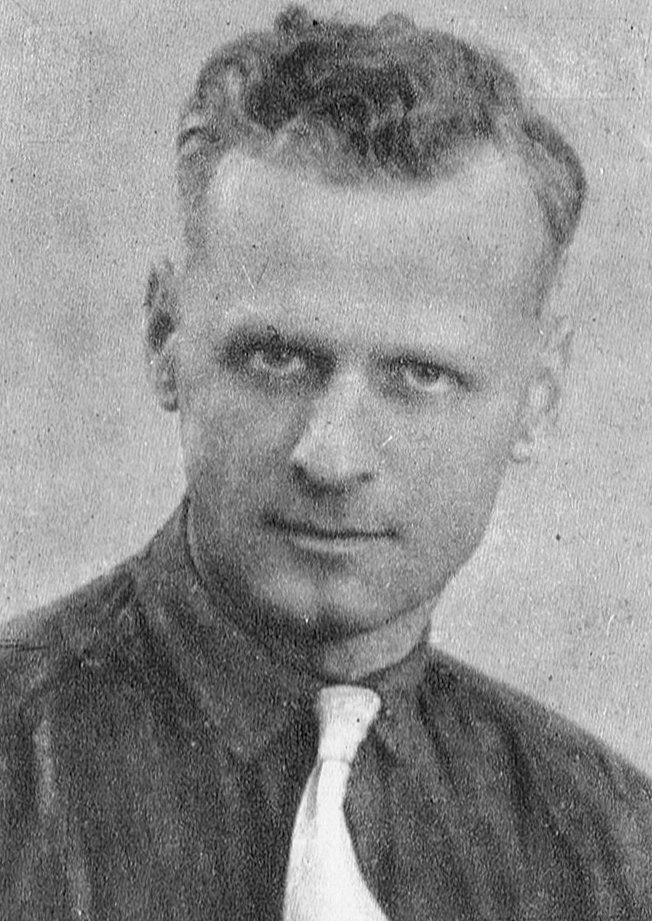
Adam Rzeszotarski

- Commander - captain of horse Adam Rzeszotarski pseudonym "Żmija";
- 224th platoon - commanded by lieutenant (name unknown) Mańczak pseudonym "Rafa",
- 225th platoon - commanded by sergeant Piotr Urabaniak pseudonym "Siwy",
- 254th platoon - commanded by officer cadet Zbigniew Ptak pseudonym "Zbigniew",
- 257th platoon - commanded by captain of horse Henryk Mostowski pseudonym "Gryf",
- 244th platoon - commanded by lieutenant Andrzej Nowak pseudonym "Andrzej".

== Course of combat in the Warsaw Uprising 1944 ==
Since 1 August units of the group fought in Marymont, but they failed to reach the holding area of their attack. Fights were waged in the Zdobycz Robotnicza Housing Estate, in the Kampinos Forest on Zaborówek and in Truskawka as part of forest-based units. Also, they took part in attacks on the Warsaw Gdańsk Station, in defence of Marymont, the "Forts" and workshops of Opel.

In the course of the fights 60% of soldiers of the group fell.

Among others, Wacław Gluth-Nowowiejski and Olgierd Budrewicz fought in the group.

== See also ==
- Żniwiarz Group
- Żaglowiec Group
- Żyrafa Group
- Żbik Group
- Zgrupowanie Żmija
