= Żbik Group =

Group of conspiracy military units of Polish Armia Krajowa

The Żbik Group (Polish: Zgrupowanie Żbik, Wildcat Group) is a group of conspiracy military units of Armia Krajowa in the Sub-district II of Żoliborz (of Armia Krajowa) in Żoliborz of Warsaw that took part in fights of the Warsaw Uprising of 1944.

== Organisation ==
- Commander - Captain Witold Plechowski, pseudonym "Sławomir"
  - 215th Platoon - commanded by Sec. Lieutenant Marian Masłowski, pseudonym "Gawron"
  - 217th Platoon - commanded by Sec. Lieutenant Marian Korytkowski, pseudonym "Żbik"
  - 233rd Platoon - commanded by Sec. Lieutenant Piotr Płoski, pseudonym "Roman"

== Course of combat in the Warsaw Uprising of 1944 ==
The units waged fights in the defence of Powązki, the Zmartwychwstanki Fortress (in the Zmartwychwstanki Monastery), as well as Lower Żoliborz. Especially heavy fights were waged in the last days of the uprising in the area of the Glass House (Szklany Dom) and Bohomolca street.

== See also ==
- Military description of the Warsaw Uprising
- Sub-district II of Żoliborz (of Armia Krajowa)
- Żaglowiec Group
- Żmija Group
- Żniwiarz Group
- Żyrafa Group

== Literature ==
- Oddziały powstania warszawskiego (Units of the Warsaw Uprising). Stanisław Komornicki ed. Warsaw 1988.
