= Nowowiejski =

Nowowiejski (feminine: Nowowiejska; plural: Nowowiejscy) is a Polish surname. Notable people with the surname include:

- Antoni Julian Nowowiejski (1858–1941), Polish Catholic bishop
- Feliks Nowowiejski (1877–1946), Polish musician
- Wacław Gluth-Nowowiejski (1926–2024), Polish Home Army soldier
