= Komornicki =

Komornicki (feminine Komornicka) is a Polish surname. Notable people with the surname include:

- Ryszard Komornicki (born 1959), Polish footballer
- Stanisław Komornicki (1924–2010), Polish military officer
