= Żoliborz Subdistrict (Home Army) =

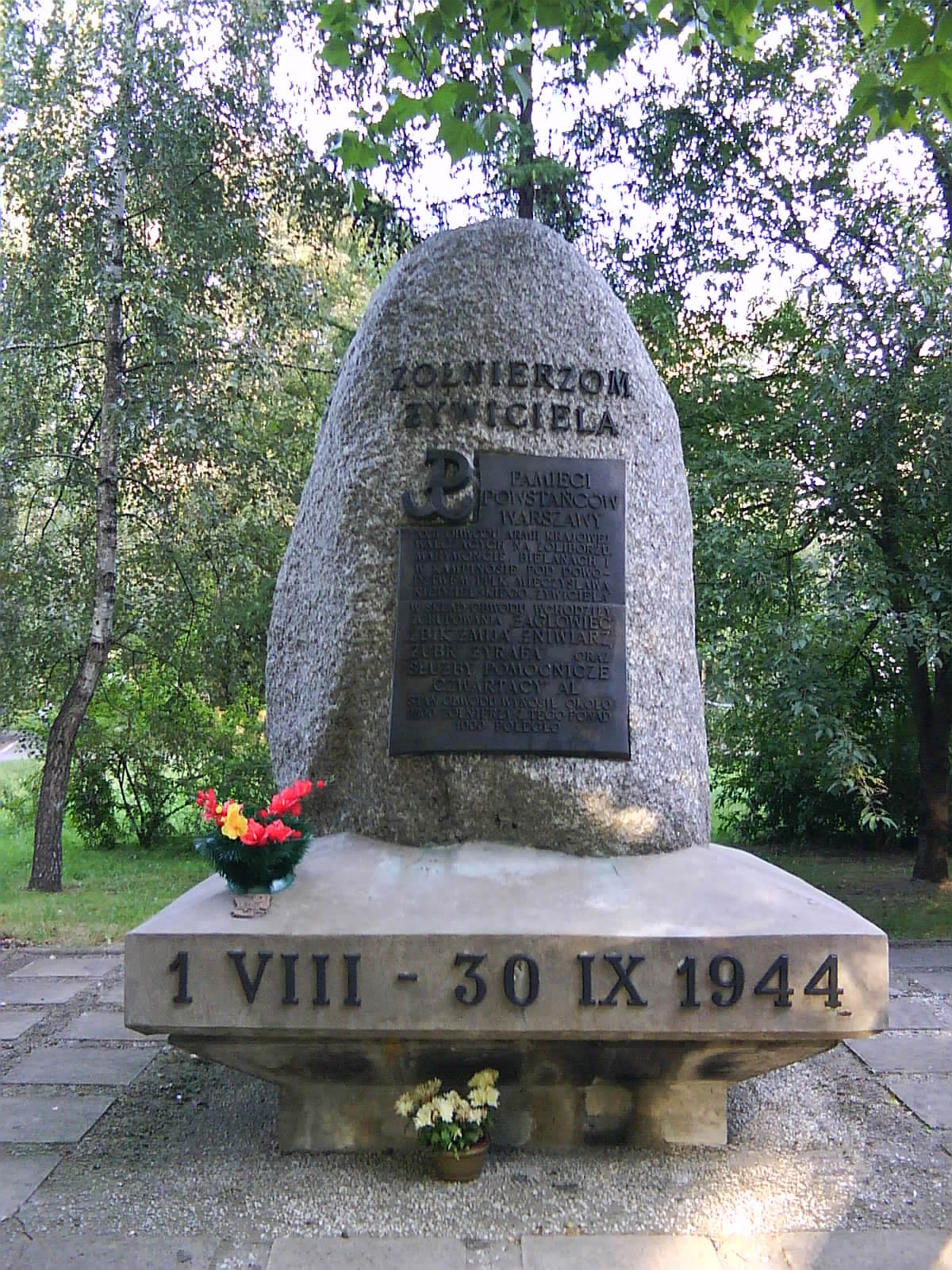
The monument of the soldiers of the Żoliborz subdistrict in the Żywiciel's Soldiers Park in Warsaw.

The Subdistrict of Żoliborz (of Armia Krajowa) (Polish: Obwód II Żoliborz also named as Obwód Żywiciel) - a territorial organisational unit of the District of Warsaw of Armia Krajowa. It covered the area of Żoliborz in Warsaw, fought in conspiracy during the German occupation of Poland during World War II and openly during the Warsaw Uprising 1944.

== Period of conspiracy ==
The origin of the sub-district goes down to various conspiracy organisations like Związek Harcerstwa Polskiego (Engl.: Association of Polish Scouts), Association of Reservists, Polish Socialist Party.

The oldest conspiracy association was formed in Żoliborz by soldiers of the 21st Infantry Regiment "Children of Warsaw" (Polish 21 Pułk Piechoty "Dzieci Warszawy". The command of it was assumed by major Stefan Obrąbski and after his arrest and deportation to a POW camp, the command was assumed by officer cadet Stefan Szuba. The first commander of the Sub-district II of Żoliborz was major Stanisław Thun pseudonym Nawrot. After him the command as assumed by major Mieczysław Niedzielski pseudonyms "Żywiciel" or "Wojciechowski" or "Sadowik".

== Organisation ==
The sub-district II of Żoliborz included four regions:

- Region I Żoliborz - commanded by captain Marian Kamiński pseudonyms "Żaglowiec" or "Ster" or "Jur";
- Region II Marymont - commanded by captain of horse Adam Rzeszotarski pseudonyms "Żmija" or "Junosza" or "Sum";
- Region III Bielany - commanded by captain Marian Masternak pseudonym "Zwoliński" (until 1943) - then by major Władysław Nowakowski pseudonyms "Serb" or "Żubr";
- Region IV Powązki - commanded by captain Kazimierz Nowacki pseudonym "Szkodnik". The region also included four platoons of the Oddziały Wojskowe Polskiej Partii Socjalistycznej (Engl.: Military Units of the Polish Socialist Party commanded by sec. lieutenant Roman Dąbrowski pseudonym "Stary".

The number of the sub-district in the beginning of 1944 amounted to 2,000 soldiers.

== Tasks assigned for an uprising case ==
Units of the sub-district were assigned the following tasks in case of military uprising:

- From the south: to seize the Warsaw Citadel, the Traugutt Fort, the Legions Fort, the Warsaw Gdańsk Station,
- From the west: to seize the Institute of Chemistry, the Bem fort, Boernerowo and an anti-aircraft artillery battery in Buraków,
- From the north: to seize the complex of the Józef Piłsudski University of Physical Education (Polish: Akademia Wychowania Fizycznego im. Józefa Piłsudskiego, the Bielany airfield and the Gas School in Marymont

== Course of combat in the Warsaw Uprising 1944 ==
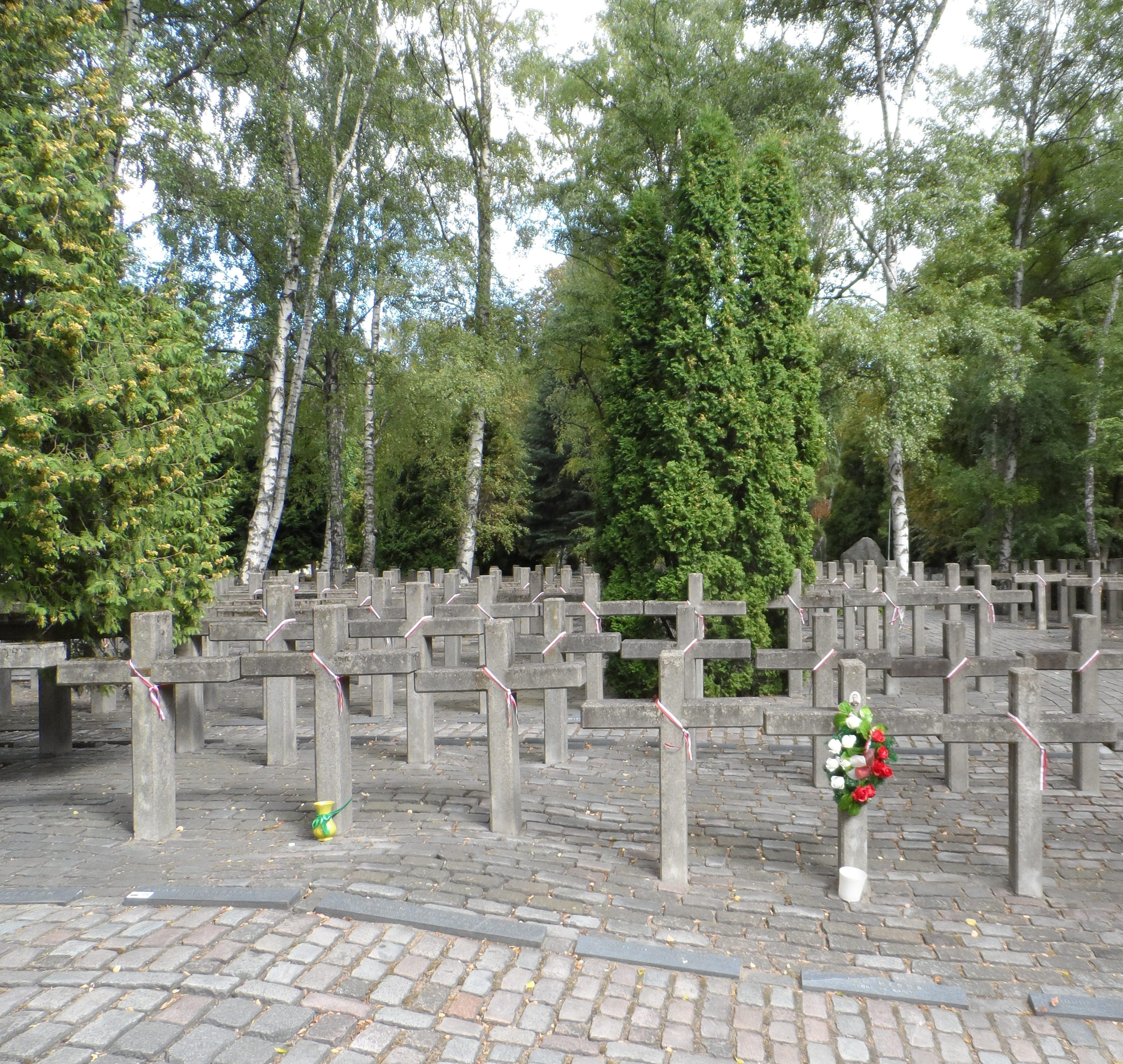
Graves of the soldiers of "Żywiciel" at the Powązki Military Cemetery

On 1 August at the hour "W" 60% of soldiers turned up in the place of mobilisation. Because of shortages of weapon and failure to use the factor of surprise, attacks of the insurgent units were forced back. The sub-district's units suffered large losses in people and equipment.

In the evening on 1 August lieutenant-colonel "Żywiciel" made a decision to withdraw the units to the Kampinos Forest and sent a woman liaison officer Ludmiła Bassalik-Chabielska pseudonym "Irena" with a report of the situation and a request of further orders to the commander of the District of Warsaw colonel Antoni Chruściel pseudonym "Monter". The same officer returned to the sub-district's units stationed in Sieraków with the order of immediate return of the units into their abandoned positions in Żoliborz. On 4 August the units reached the center of Żoliborz and joined the course of fights.

Lieutenant-colonel "Żywiciel" reorganised the sub-district II and ordered to re-group the units. He created 6 groups (Polish: zgrupowanie plural: zgrupowania) of the line, with cryptonyms starting from letter "Ż":

- Żaglowiec Group (Sailing-ship Group) (Polish: "Zgrupowanie Żaglowiec"),
- Żbik Group (Wildcat Group) (Polish: "Zgrupowanie Żbik"),
- Żmija Group (Viper Group) (Polish: "Zgrupowanie Żmija"),
- Żniwiarz Group (Harvester Group) (Polish: "Zgrupowanie Żniwiarz").
- Żubr Group (Aurochs Group') (Polish: "Zgrypowanie Żubr"),
- Żyrafa Group (Giraffe Group) (Polish: "Zgrupowanie Żyrafa").

Carrying on heavy fights and suffering large losses, the units of the sub-district hold out on until the capitulation of Żoliborz on 30 September 1944.

The following persons, among others, fought in the sub-district: Henryk Ligięza, Danuta Przystasz, Jan Strzelecki and Zygmunt Trószyński.

== See also ==
- Military description of the Warsaw Uprising
