= "W" Hour =

Start of the Warsaw Uprising in WW2

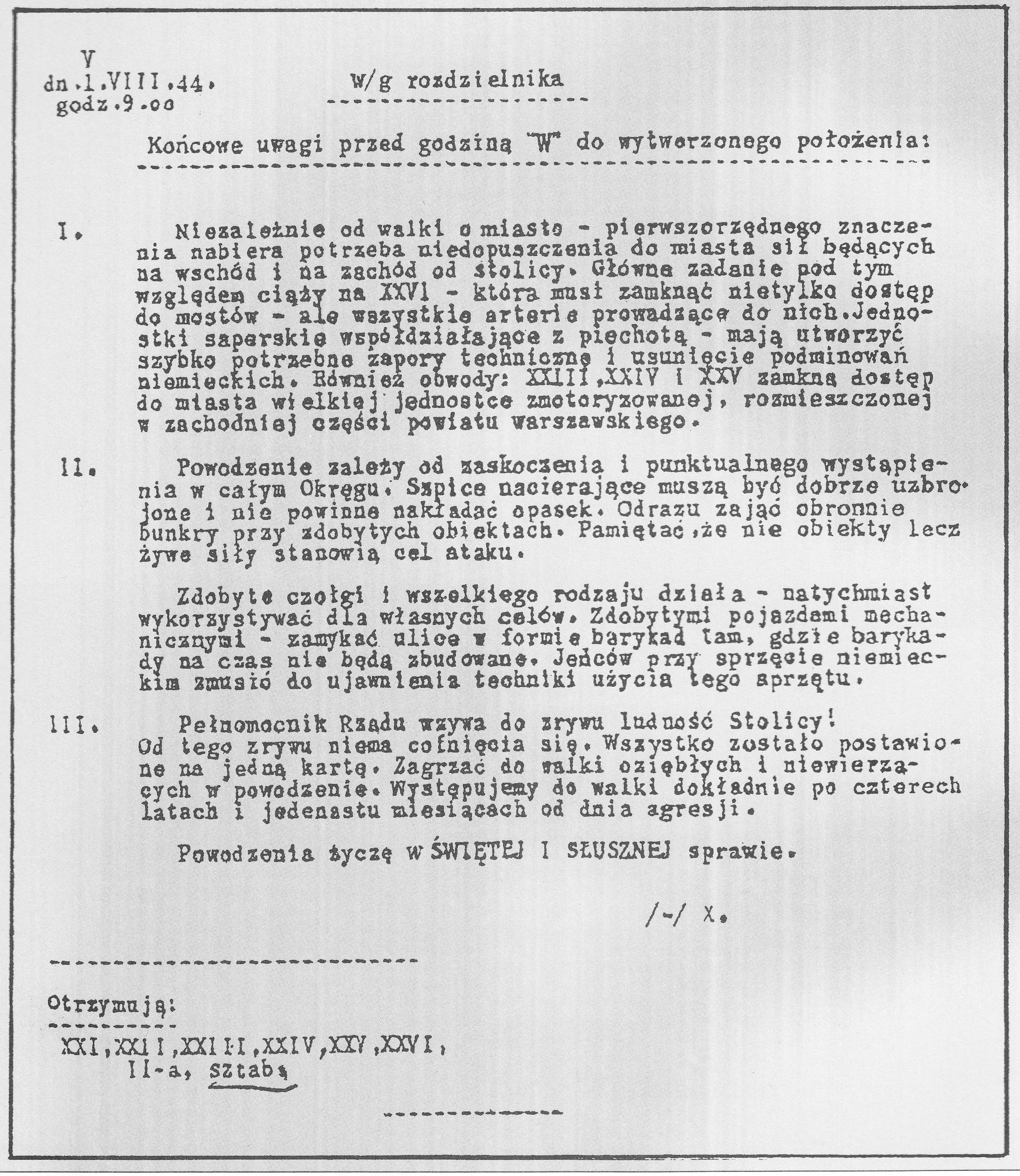
Final remarks to the plan before the "W" Hour, signed by Antoni Chrusciel "Monter" on 1 August 1944 at 9:00 AM.

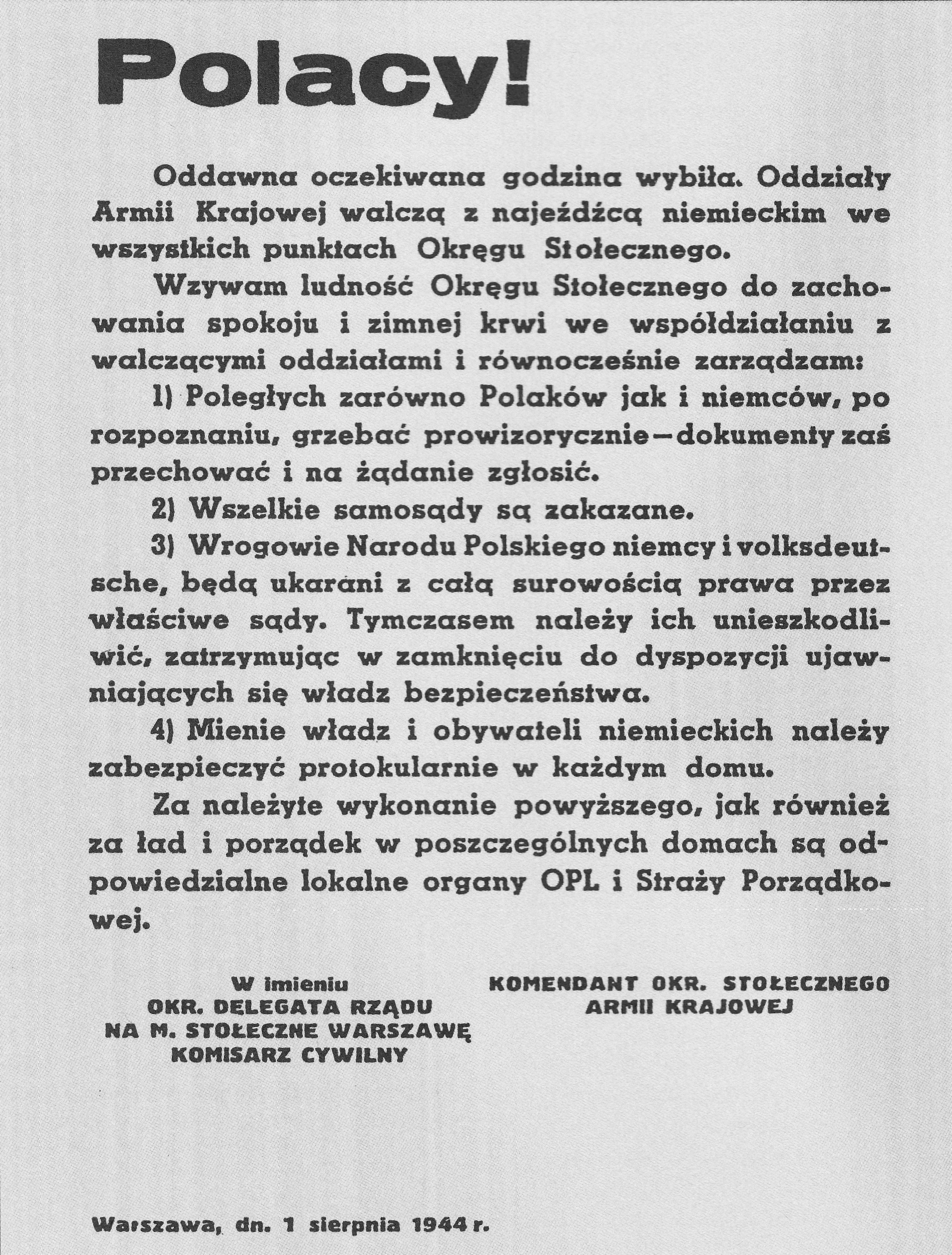
The appeal issued by the uprising command posted on city streets, 1 August 1944.

"W" Hour, also spelled as W-Hour (Polish: Godzina „W”'), was the codename for the date and time that began Operation Tempest in German-occupied Warsaw, and hence the Warsaw Uprising. The exact time was 5:00 PM on 1 August 1944.

== Origin ==
On 31 July 1944, during a briefing of Home Army's general staff (Polish: Komenda Głowna Armii Krajowej) at Panska Street No. 67, General Tadeusz Bór-Komorowski, commander of the Home Army, received a report from General Antoni Chruściel (codename "Monter"), commander of the Warsaw district, regarding a supposed successful Soviet breach of German defenses just outside of the Praga suburb. The information was actually false, but on its basis, at 5:45 PM, Bór-Komorowski gave Chruściel an oral order to begin Operation Tempest on 1 August 1944 at 5:00 PM. The order was given upon Chruściel's request. Jan Stanisław Jankowski, the Government Delegate for Poland, was present, having previously consulted regarding the order with Tadeusz Pełczyński (codename "Grzegorz"), deputy commander, and Leopold Okulicki (codename "Kobra"), chief of staff. Janina Karasiówna was also present.

A few notable individuals were absent during the meeting: Kazimierz Iranek-Osmecki (codename "Heller"), Chief of Intelligence of the Home Army; Józef Szostak (codename "Filip"), Chief of the Operations Unit; and Kazimierz Pluta-Czachowski (codename "Kuczaba"), Chief of Communications. They all arrived at 6:00 PM when only Bór-Komorowski was left to inform the rest of the general staff of the decision. At this time, Bór-Komorowski was informed of a German counterattack on Soviet positions outside of Praga, but did not cancel the order.

After returning to his headquarters at Filtrowa Street No. 68, Chruściel gave the following order:

Alarm to District Commanders in person. On 31.7 at 7:00 PM. I command you ON 1.08 at 5:00 PM. Address m. p. District: Jasna 22 ap. 20 opened from hour "W". Delivery of the order must be immediately acknowledged.

The Home Army's previous plans for the uprising called for it to begin in the early morning. On 29 July 1944, on Chruściel's request, it was decided that it would start at 5:00 PM. The exact day however was only to be chosen a day before fighting were to begin. The choice of the hour was dictated by heavy street traffic from commuters returning from work; the presence of traffic would allow soldiers to blend in and safely get to their meeting points, as well as to transport guns and ammunition. Additionally, at 5:00 PM there would be ample sunlight for the operation.

== 1 August ==
The order was issued by Chruściel at around 7:00 PM – just an hour before military curfew. As a result, it was delivered between 7:00 and 9:00 AM the next morning to district commanders. Group commanders received it between 9:00 and 13:30 PM. In the afternoon the total number of messengers delivering the order reached 6,000.

The order to start the uprising surprised most commanders. There wasn't enough time to retrieve weapons from secret stashes and gather all the soldiers at the meeting points as they were scattered across the entire city. At "W" Hour – 5:00 PM – total mobilization only reached 60%.

Not all units managed to keep the mobilization a secret until 5:00 PM. The first shots were fired at a German patrol at 13:35 PM on Krasinski Street in Żoliborz by members of Zdzisław Sierpinski's team, who were transporting weapons for a unit of the "Reaper" Group. The Germans quickly brought a tank and a few armored vehicles with machine guns. While sweeping the area, at 5:30 PM on Suzina Street, the German patrol surprised a Polish unit from the 4th Battalion of the Military Units of the Uprising Emergency of Socialists and SOB who were extracting weapons from a stash. SOB commander Włodzimierz Kaczanowski was killed in that fight. These skirmishes resulted in German control of key intersections of Żoliborz and alerted nearby German units stationed in the Warsaw Citadel and Bielany Airport.

The fights broke before 5:00 PM in at least eight different instances across the city.

The Warsaw District Staff of the Home Army, including Antoni Chruściel, was stationed in an apartment at Jasna Street No. 20 up until 5:00 PM when it moved to captured Hotel Victoria (No 26). The headquarters, along with Tadeusz Bór-Komorwski, were stationed in the Kemler Furniture Factory at 72 Dzielna Street.

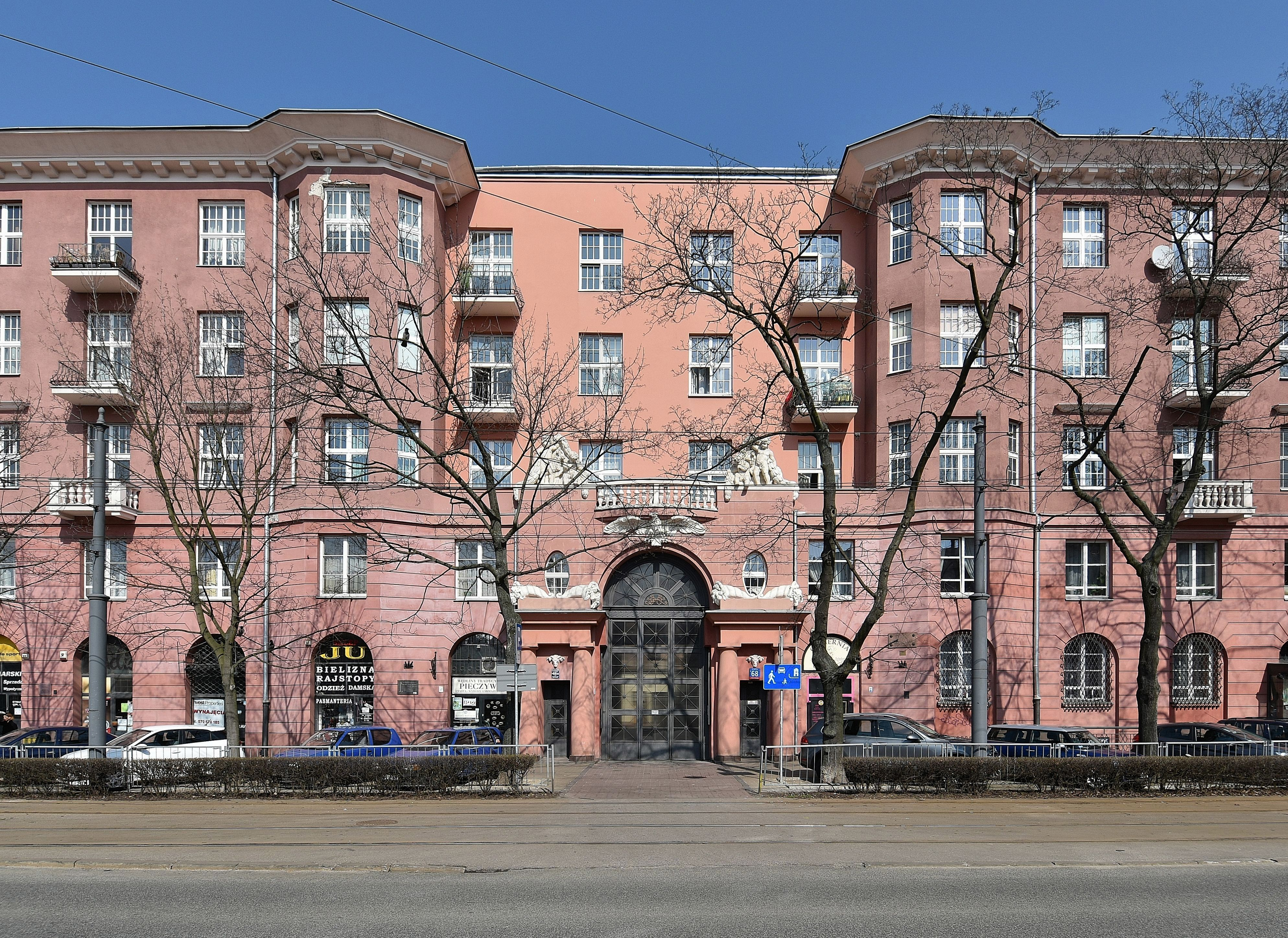
Dom dochodowy PKO (The Income House PKO) at 68 Filtrowa Street, where Antoni Chrusciel signed the order setting the "W" Hour to 5:00 PM on 1 August 1944.

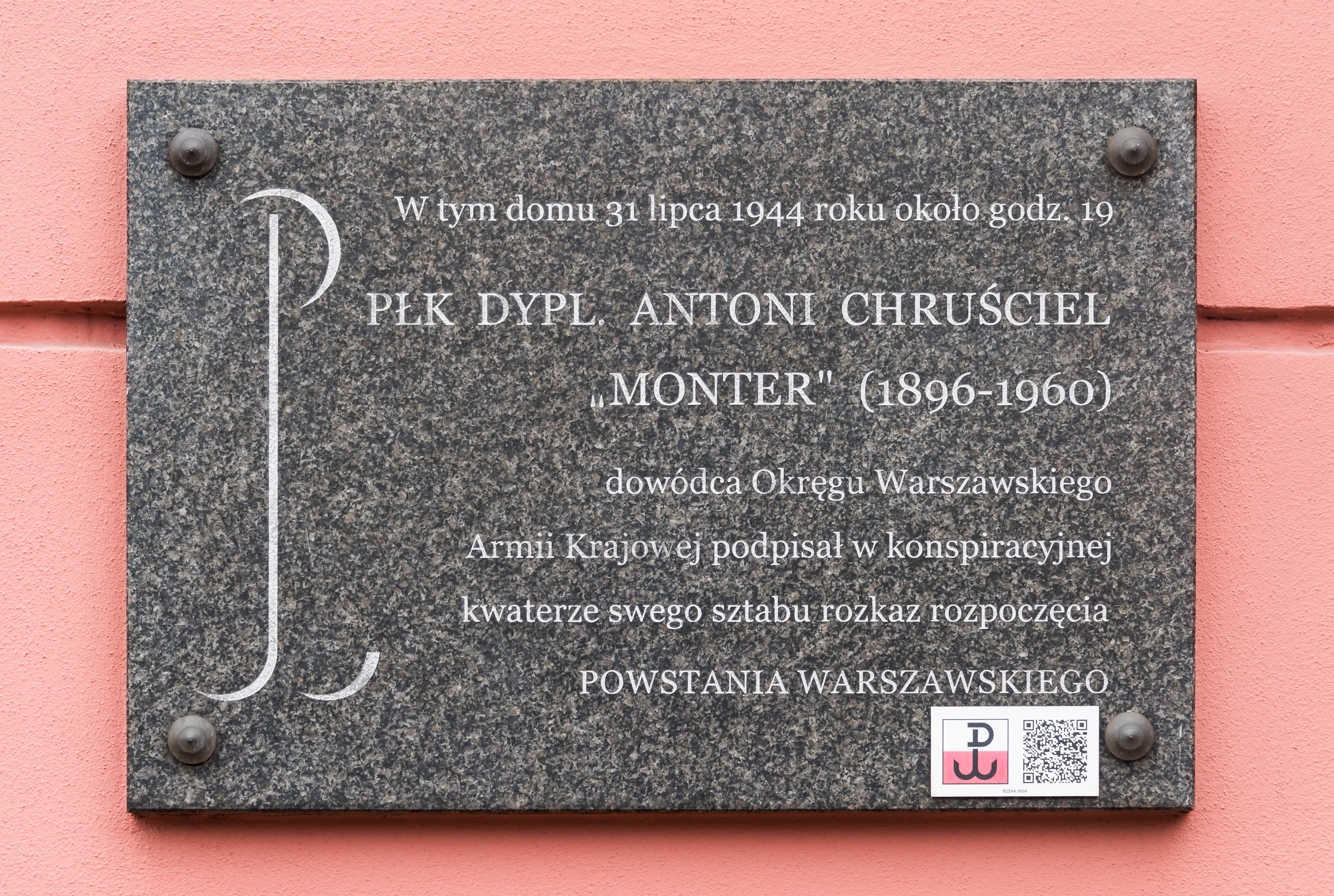
Memorial tablet on the building.

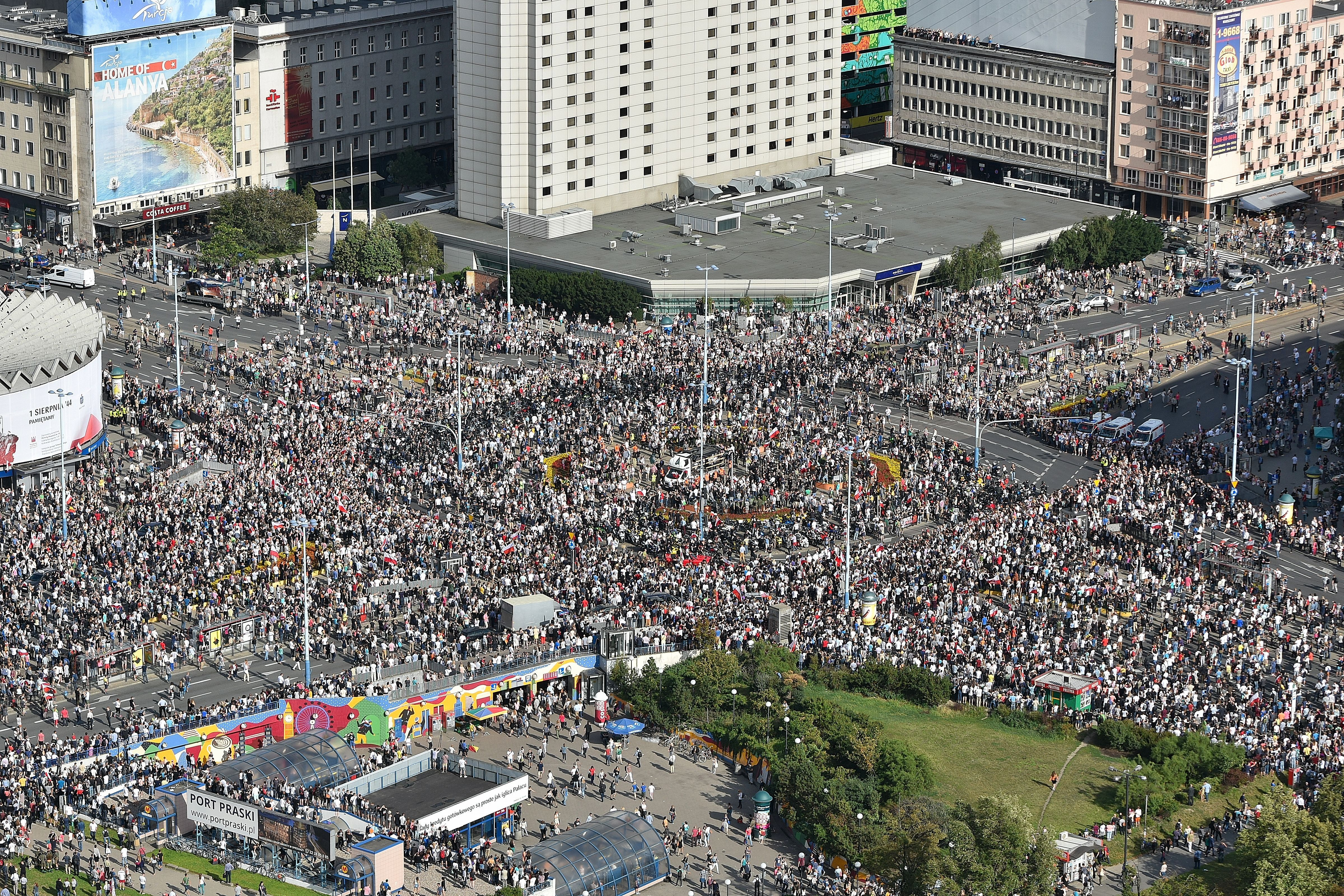
Commemoration of the "W" Hour on Roman Dmowski roundabout (2016)

Incoming reports on the situation in the city convinced general Reiner Stahel, the military commander of Warsaw, to declare an alarm for the Warsaw Garrison at 4:30 PM. The Germans, however, were unable to stop the uprising from happening.

== Commemorations ==
- July 2004 – stairs leading to the Warsaw Uprising Mound were named "The Hour "W" Avenue"
- A memory plaque was placed on the building at 68 Filtrowa Street, where Antoni Chrusciel "Monter" signed the original order
- Every year in Warsaw and other parts of Poland on 1 August at 5:00 PM alarm signals and sirens are turned on. Public transport, buses, tramways, many cars and pedestrians stop in silence. At the same time a ceremony starts at the Gloria Victis Monument in the Powazki Military Cemetery.

== Present use ==
The term the "W" hour is commonly used in Poland to describe unavoidable, important events.
