= Żaglowiec Group =

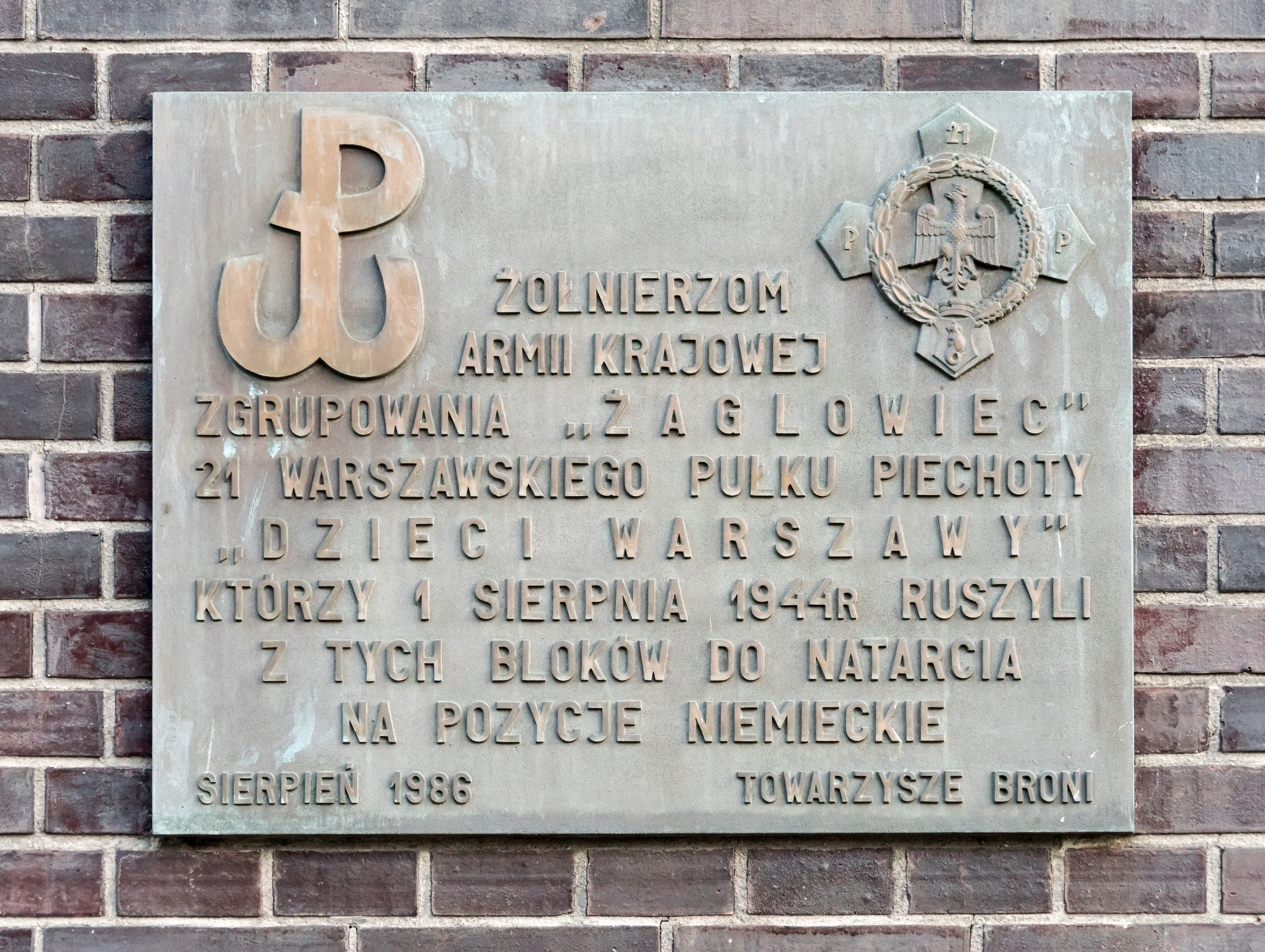
Plaque to commemorate soldiers of the Żaglowiec Group, placed in the point of concentration of its units on 1 August 1944 on Dymińska 10 street in Warsaw.

The Żaglowiec Group (Polish: Zgrupowanie Żaglowiec) (Sailing-ship Group) was a group of conspiracy military units of Armia Krajowa in the Sub-district II of Żoliborz in Żoliborz of Warsaw during the German occupation of Poland. They fought in the Warsaw Uprising in 1944.

== Organisation ==
Commander - captain Marian Kamiński pseudonym "Żaglowiec":

- 201st platoon - commanded by sec. lieutenant Eugeniusz Piotrowski pseudonym "Gama",
- 202nd platoon - commanded by sec. lieutenant Tadeusz Magier pseudonym "Żytomirski",
- 204th platoon - commanded by lieutenant Wacław Wysocki pseudonym "Piotr",
- 205th platoon - commanded by officer cadet Michał Churło pseudonym "Vis",
- 206th platoon - commanded by sec. lieutenant Witold Jabłonowski pseudonym "Marek",
- 207th platoon - commanded by lieutenant Henryk Czerwiec pseudonym "Jaskulski",
- 208th platoon - commanded by sec. lieutenant Edward Bonarowski pseudonym "Ostromir",
- 209th platoon - commanded by sec. lieutenant Józef Krzywnicki pseudonym "Prawdzic".

== Course of combat in the Warsaw Uprising 1944 ==
The group waged fights in Żoliborz: of the Warsaw Citadel, Forty Traugutta (Traugutt's Forts), Plac Inwalidów and Żoliborz Oficerski (Officers' Żoliborz).

A significant effort of "Żaglowiec Group" was two unsuccessful night attacks on the Warsaw Gdańsk Station done in the night from 20 to 21 August, during an attempt by military units from Kampinos Forest to fight their way to relieve the falling Warsaw Old Town.

Human losses of the group amounted to 24% of killed and 21% wounded.

== See also ==
- Żubr Group
- Żmija Group
- Żniwiarz Group
- Żyrafa Group
- Żbik Group
