= Żywiciel's Soldiers Park =

Urban park in Warsaw, Poland

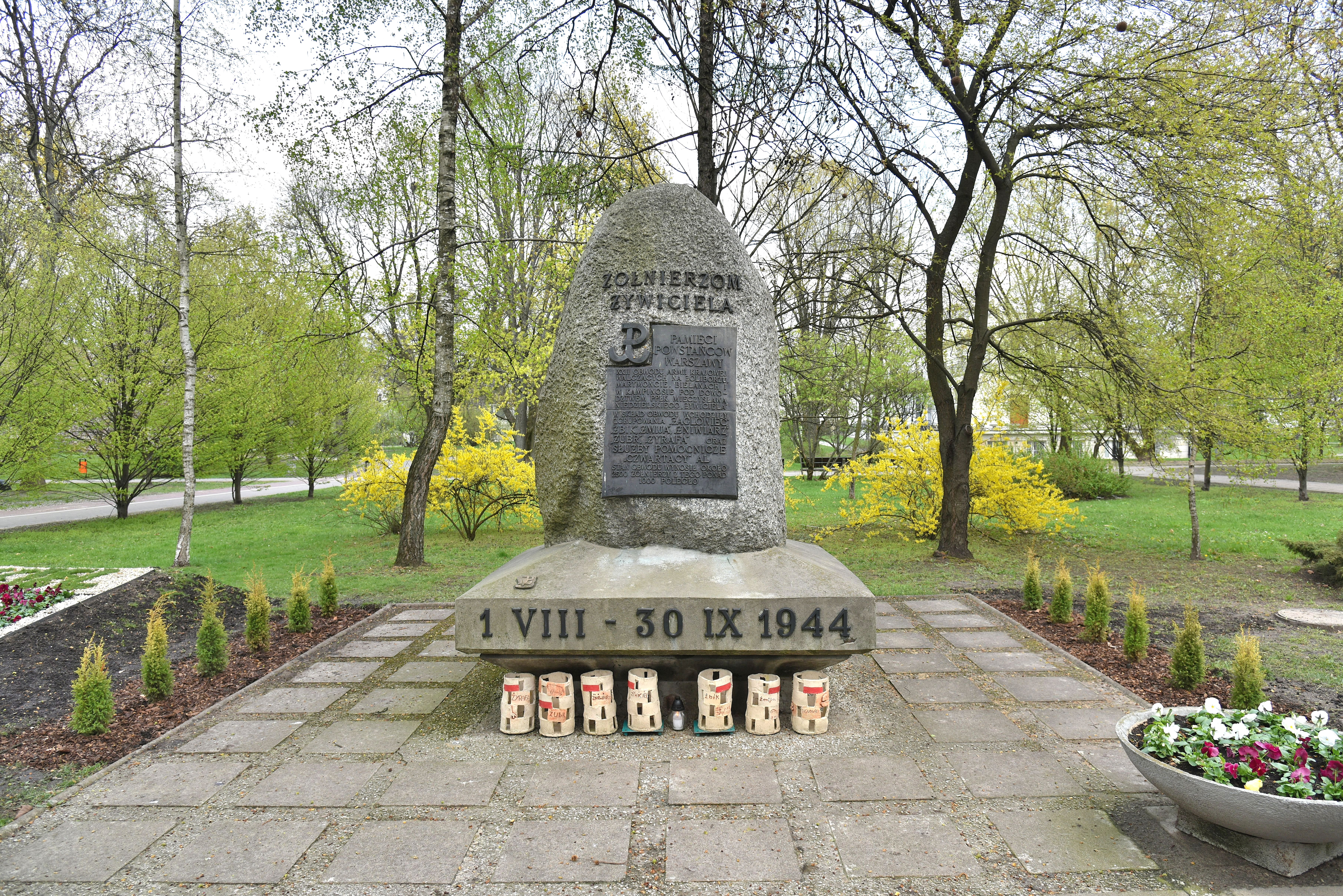
- The monument of the soldiers of the Żoliborz Subdistrict of the Home Army in the Żywiciel's Soldiers Park, in 2017.
- Interactive map of Żywiciel's Soldiers Park
- Type: Urban park
- Location: Żoliborz, Warsaw, Poland
- Coordinates: 52°16′08.47″N 20°58′38.14″E
- Created: 1950s

The Żywiciel's Soldiers Park (Note: Polish: Park im. Żołnierzy Żywiciela w Warszawie) is an urban park in Warsaw, Poland. It is located in the district of Żoliborz, between Popiełuszki Street, Próchnika Street, Sarmatów Street, and Harcerska Street. It was opened in the 1950s.

== History ==
Prior to the World War II, in the location of the current park was placed the military complex of the Explosive Materials General Warehouses of the Polish Armed Forces. It consisted of the seven gun power warehouses, laboratory, a house, a stable. They were surrounded by ramparts. The last surviving building stood there until 1971.

The park was opened in the 1950s, as part of the Żoliborz Centralny neighbourhood of the Warsaw Housing Association. It was dedicated to the soldiers of the Żoliborz Subdistrict of the Home Army, who fought in the Warsaw Uprising under major Mieczysław Niedzielski, known under pseudonym "Żywiciel". There was also placed a monument dedicated to them.

In 2012, in the park was placed sculpture Woman with a child by Alina Szapocznikow.

== Characteristics ==
The park is located within the neighbourhood of Old Żoliborz, within the district of Żoliborz, between Popiełuszki Street, Próchnika Street, Sarmatów Street, and Harcerska Street.

It includes a monument dedicated to the soldiers of the Żoliborz Subdistrict of the Home Army, who fought in the Warsaw Uprising under major Mieczysław Niedzielski, known under pseudonym "Żywiciel". There is also located sculpture Woman with a child by Alina Szapocznikow, and two London plane trees with the status of natural monuments.

== Gallery ==
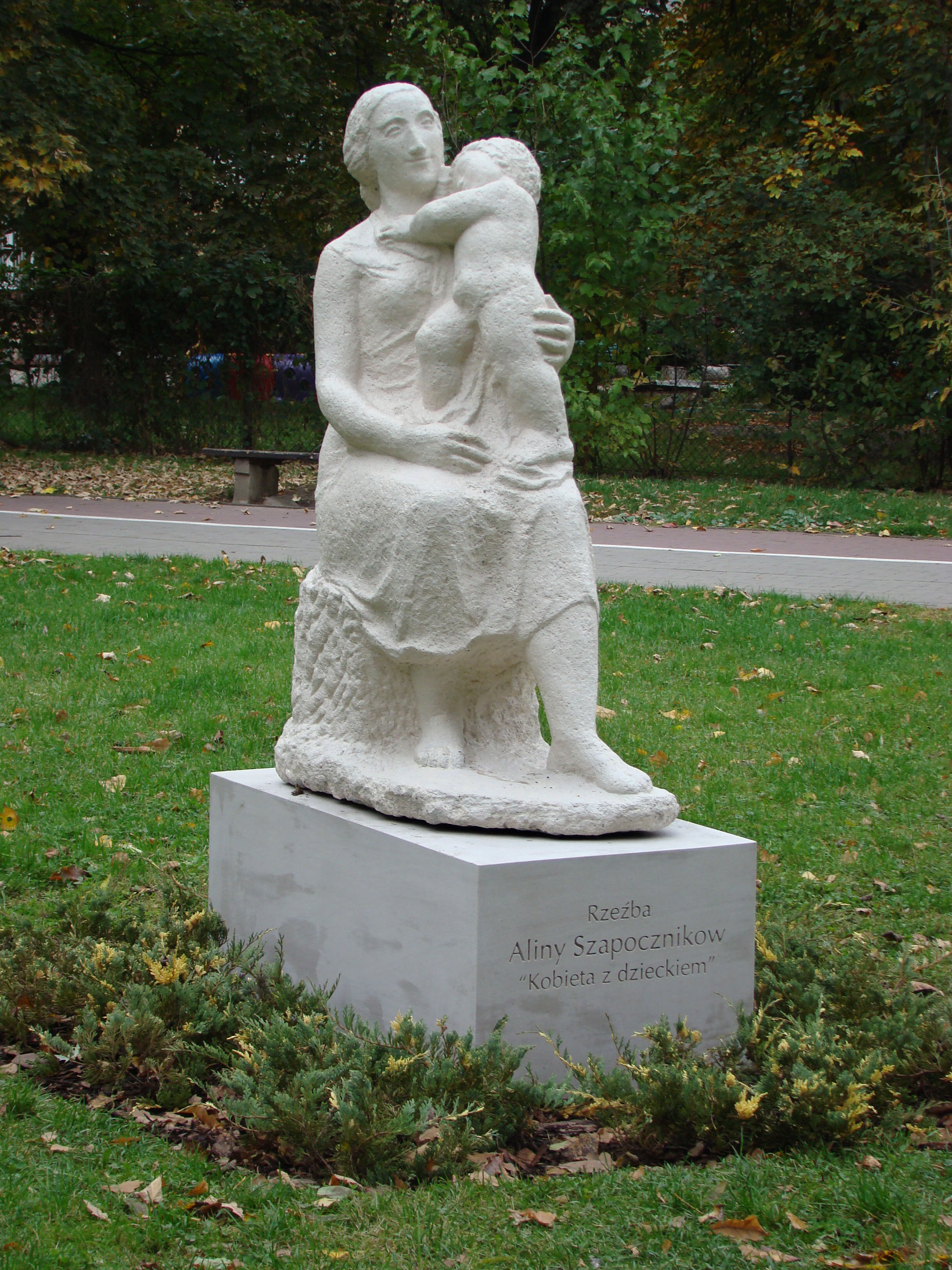
The sculpture Woman with a child by Alina Szapocznikow.
