= Żyrafa Group =

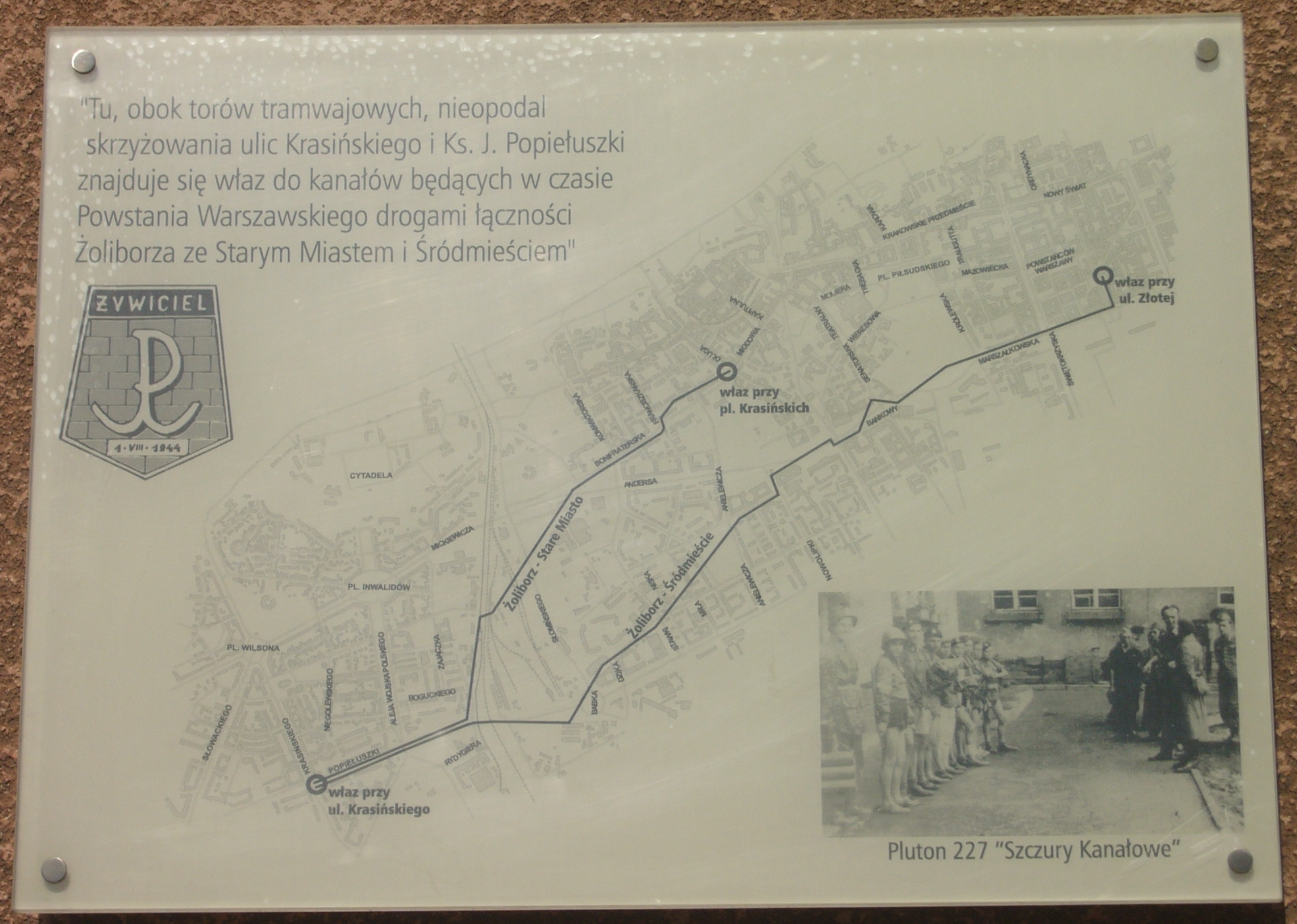
A plaque to commemorate the communication of Żoliborz with Śródmieście and the Old Town, operated by scouts of the 227th platoon of the "Żyrafa" Group in the Sub-district II of Żoliborz

The Żyrafa Group (Polish: Zgrupowanie Żyrafa (i.e. Giraffe Group)) was a group of military units of Armia Krajowa, which fought during the Warsaw Uprising of 1944 in the Sub district II of Żoliborz (of Armia Krajowa), which included the Żoliborz district of Warsaw.

== Composition and command ==
- Commander - sec. lieutenant Lt Ryszard “Tatar” Wołczyński,
- 227th Scout Battalion - sec. Liaison officer Ewa Ponińska
- Home Army - sec. Commander Gen Tadeusz Bór-Komorowski
- 1st company - commanded by sec. lieutenant Marian Mehrenhole pseudonym "Wiktor",
- 2nd company - commanded by sec. lieutenant Jan Zaliwski pseudonym "Jan";
- 3rd company - commanded by sec. lieutenant Kazimierz Woyde pseudonym "Sikora".

== Course of combat in the Warsaw Uprising 1944 ==
During the last days the last days Żyrafa's command was located in the buildings on Krasińskiego 20 and 29, and the Resurrectionist convent. The Germans were attacking first artillery drum fire, then tanks and troops. The group fought in Aleje Wojska Polskiego, in Stołeczna street, in Plac Henkla, in the Monastery of Zmartwychwstanki Sisters (the so-called "Zmartwychwstanki Fortress") in Krasińskiego street, where savage and bloody fights were waged. In the crossing of Krasińkiego and Stołeczna streets there was an access hatch into the sewer, by which communication with the Old Town was kept.

Among others, Rajmund Kazimierz Łaszczyński fought in the group.

=== See also ===
- Żubr Group (Polish: Zgrupowanie Żubr)
- Żmija Group (Polish: Zgrupowanie Żmija)
- Żaglowiec Group (Polish: Zgrupowanie Żaglowiec)
- Żniwiarz Group (Polish: Zgrupowanie Żniwiarz)
- Żbik Group (Polish: Zgrupowanie Żbik)
- Sub-district II of Żoliborz (of Armia Krajowa)
- Military description of the Warsaw Uprising
