= Antoni Zdanowski =

Polish social and union activist

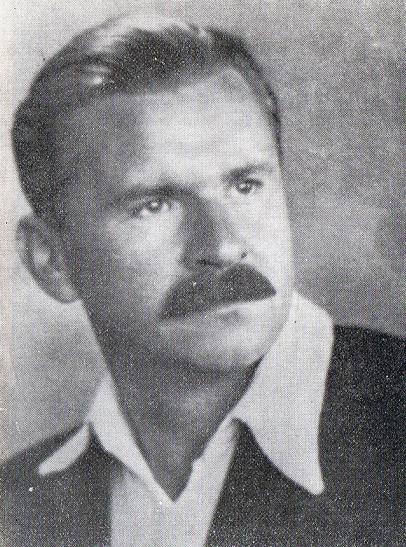
- Portrait of Zdanowski, 1938
- Born: April 5, 1895; Węgrów, Congress Poland
- Died: January 19, 1948 (aged 52); Warsaw, Poland
- Resting place: Powązki Cemetery
- Other names: Bis; Tolek
- Known for: Co-founder of the Warsaw Housing Cooperative
- Political party: PPS
- Other political affiliations: PPS-WRN
- Spouse: Janina Pajdak
- Parents: Piotr (father); Maria née Złotkowska (mother)

Antoni Zdanowski (1895–1948) was a Polish social and union activist, and also an editor of Robotniczy Przegląd Gospodarczy. In 1917 he became a member of Polish Socialist Party in Russia.

During 1919–1920 he was a secretary of Central Commission of Trade Unions and from 1925–1939 he served as its vice-general secretary. In 1921, he co-founded the Warsaw Housing Cooperative.

During World War II Zdanowski was a member of Polish Socialist Party – Freedom, Equality, Independence and in the years of 1940–1945 manager of its Central Party Administration.

He and his wife, Janina Pajdak, were arrested in 1947 by the by Office of Security. She died that same year in prison. He died the following year (1948) in prison.
