= Wacław Gluth-Nowowiejski =

Polish soldier and author (1926–2024)

- Wacław Gluth-Nowowiejski in the editorial office of Kurier Polski (1970)
- Born: 10 June 1926
- Died: 23 December 2024 (aged 98)
- Other name: Wacek
- Occupation: Soldier of the Polish Home Army
- Known for: Participant in the Warsaw Uprising
- Father: Alojzy Gluth (later, Nowowiejski)

Wacław Gluth-Nowowiejski (Wacek) (10 June 1926 – 23 December 2024) was a soldier of the Polish Home Army (AK), a participant in the Warsaw Uprising, and after the war, a publicist and author.

== Background ==
Wacław Gluth-Nowowiejski was born in Warsaw on 10 June 1926. His father was Alojzy Gluth, who later added the name "Nowowiejski" after one of the characters (Adam Nowowiejski) from Henryk Sienkiewicz's novel Fire in the Steppe. Alojzy had been a member of the paramilitary organization Strzelec in the Austrian partition part of Poland and later, during World War I, served in Józef Piłsudski's Polish Legions. Wacław had three older brothers.

Gluth-Nowowiejski died on 23 December 2024, at the age of 98.

== World War II ==
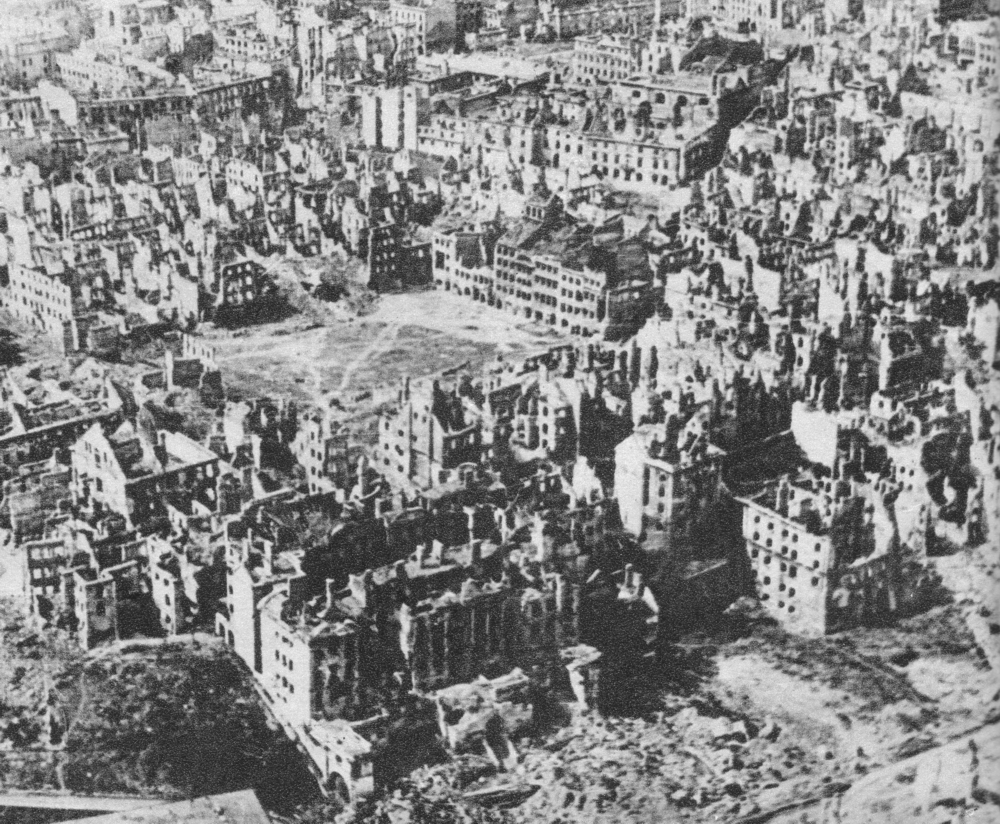
The ruins of Warsaw, after its systematic and planned destruction by the Nazis. Gluth-Nowowiejski hid in the ruins from late September until mid November 1944.

At the outbreak of World War II and the German invasion of Poland, in 1939, Wacław was thirteen years old. In 1944 he became a member of the Polish anti-Nazi resistance group, the Armia Krajowa (Home Army). He took part in the Warsaw Uprising as a commander of the Żmija Group (Viper Group), fighting in the Żoliborz district. He was wounded on 14 September in Marymont. Subsequently, he hid in the ruins of the destroyed city as one of the Robinson Crusoes of Warsaw, until November 1944. He survived the war, although all three of his brothers were killed during the German occupation of Poland.

== After the war ==
After the war, in 1948, Waclaw was arrested by the Communist authorities of the People's Republic of Poland for keeping in contact with former Home Army soldiers who had gone into anti-communist resistance and for belonging to a student group named "Keep Smiling" (original name in English). The secret police believed "Keep Smiling" to be an American/British spy network because of its foreign name. He was beaten and tortured during interrogation. After a show trial, he was imprisoned until 1953.

After being released, he wrote several books about his wartime experiences including Śmierć poczeka (Death can wait), Nie umieraj do jutra (Don't die till tomorrow), Stolica jaskiń: z pamięci warszawskiego Robinsona (The capital of caves: from the memories of a Warsaw Robinson) and Rzeczpospolita gruzów (The Commonwealth of ruins), which was adopted into a short comic by Polish artist Jerzy Wróblewski in 1979. In the same year Gluth-Nowowiejski also wrote the story for another of Wróblewski's war related comics, Czterej na drodze śmierci (Four on the road of death).

In the 1980s he took part as a consultant in the making of several documentary films about the Warsaw Uprising.
