= Stanisław Komornicki =

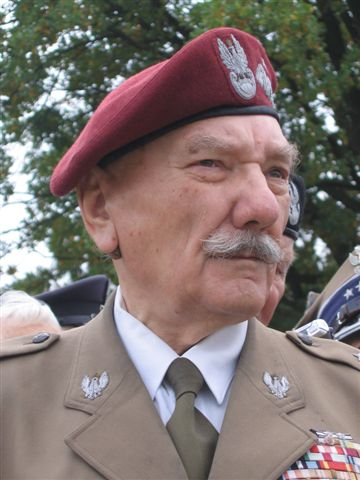
- Born: 26 July 1924; Warsaw, Poland
- Died: 10 April 2010 (aged 85); Smolensk, Russia
- Rank: Brigadier general
- Battles / wars: Second World War (Warsaw Uprising, Battle of Kolberg)
- Awards: Srebrny Krzyż Orderu Wojennego Virtuti Militari Order Polonia Restituta Order Krzyża Grunwaldu Cross of Valour Partisan Cross Warsaw Uprising Cross Cross of the Home Army

Stanisław Komornicki (26 July 1924 – 10 April 2010) was a brigadier general in the Polish Army and the chancellor of the Order Virtuti Militari. He was born in Warsaw. He was a Polish underground activist (pseudonym: Nałęcz), a member of underground Scouting (Szare Szeregi), a soldier of Armia Krajowa, a participant in the Warsaw Uprising, an officer of the Polish First Army, a participant in the Battle of Kolberg, a writer, and a military historian.

He was listed on the flight manifest of the Tupolev Tu-154 of the 36th Special Aviation Regiment carrying the President of Poland Lech Kaczyński which crashed near Smolensk-North airport near Pechersk near Smolensk, Russia, on 10 April 2010, killing all aboard.

== Honours and awards ==
Silver Cross of Virtuti Militari
Grand Cross of the Order of Polonia Restituta
Commander's Cross with Star of the Order of Polonia Restituta
Knight's Cross of the Order of Polonia Restituta
Order of the Cross of Grunwald 3rd Class
Cross of Valour twice
Partisan Cross
Warsaw Uprising Cross
Cross of the Home Army
Medal „Zasłużonym na Polu Chwały”
Medal for Warsaw 1939-1945
Medal for Oder, Neisse and Baltic
Medal of Victory and Freedom 1945
Jubilee Medal "Forty Years of Victory in the Great Patriotic War 1941-1945"
Award of the Minister of National Defence (1964, for a book on the barricades of Warsaw)
