= Józef Piłsudski University of Physical Education =

Higher education institution for sport and physical education in Warsaw, Poland

Coordinates: 52°17′07″N 20°57′16″E

Józef Piłsudski University of Physical Education in Warsaw
- Akademia Wychowania Fizycznego Józefa Piłsudskiego w Warszawie
- Other name: AWF
- Former names: Central Institute of Physical Education, Centralny Instytut Wychowania Fizycznego (1927–1935); First Marshall of Poland Józef Piłsudki Central Institute of Physical Education, Centralny Instytut Wychowania Fizycznego im. Pierwszego Marszałka Polski Józefa Piłsudskiego (1935–1938); General of the Branch Karol Świerczewski Academy of Physical Education, Akademia Wychowania Fizycznego im. gen. broni Karola Świerczewskiego (1949–1990)
- Established: December 9, 1929
- Rector: Bartosz Molik
- Students: 4,070 (12.2023)
- Location: Marymoncka 34, Warsaw, 00-968, Poland
- Website: www.awf.edu.pl

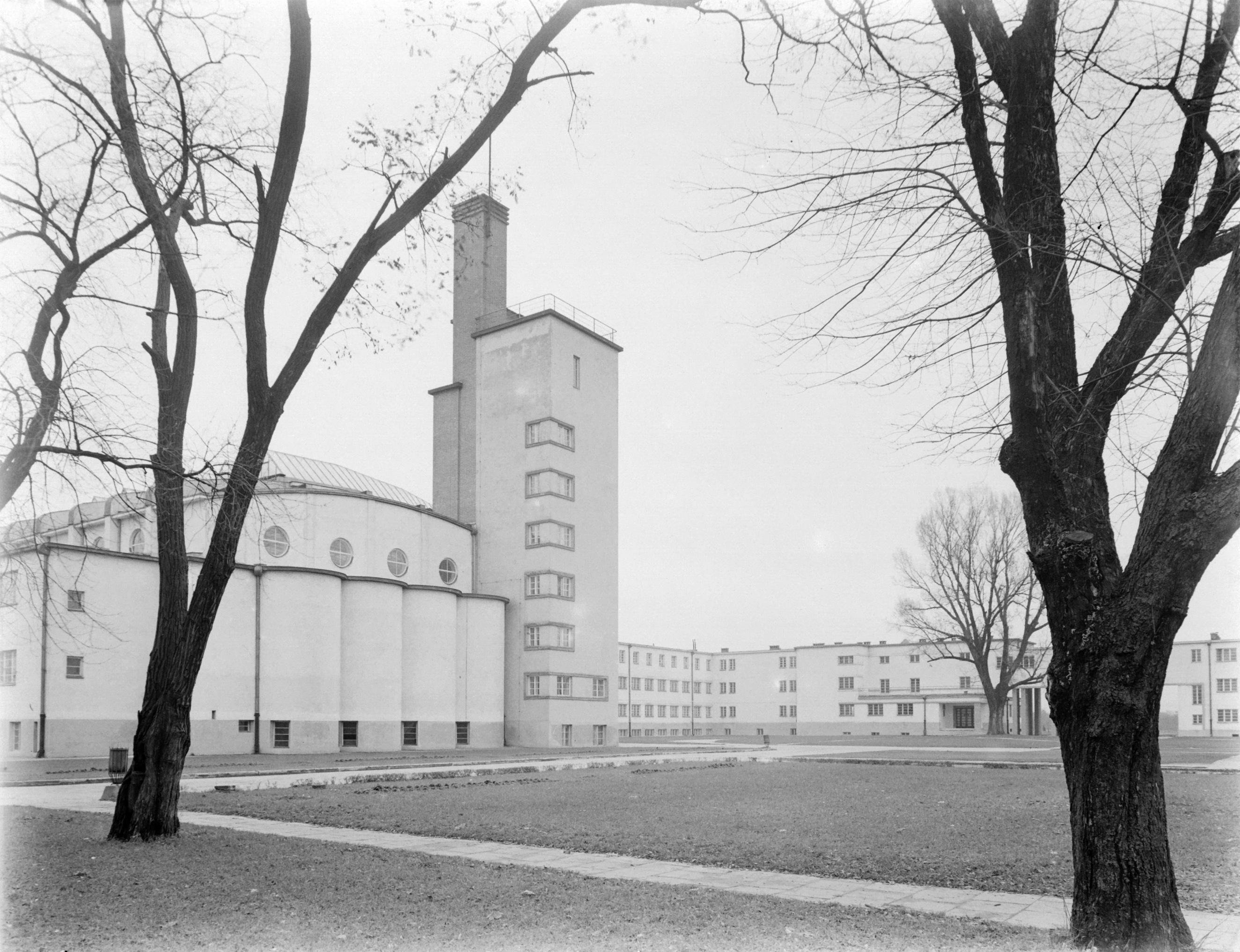
The Institute in 1934

Józef Piłsudski University of Physical Education in Warsaw (Polish: Akademia Wychowania Fizycznego Józefa Piłsudskiego w Warszawie, lit. 'Józef Piłsudski Academy of Physical Education in Warsaw') is a public institution of higher learning in Warsaw, Poland.

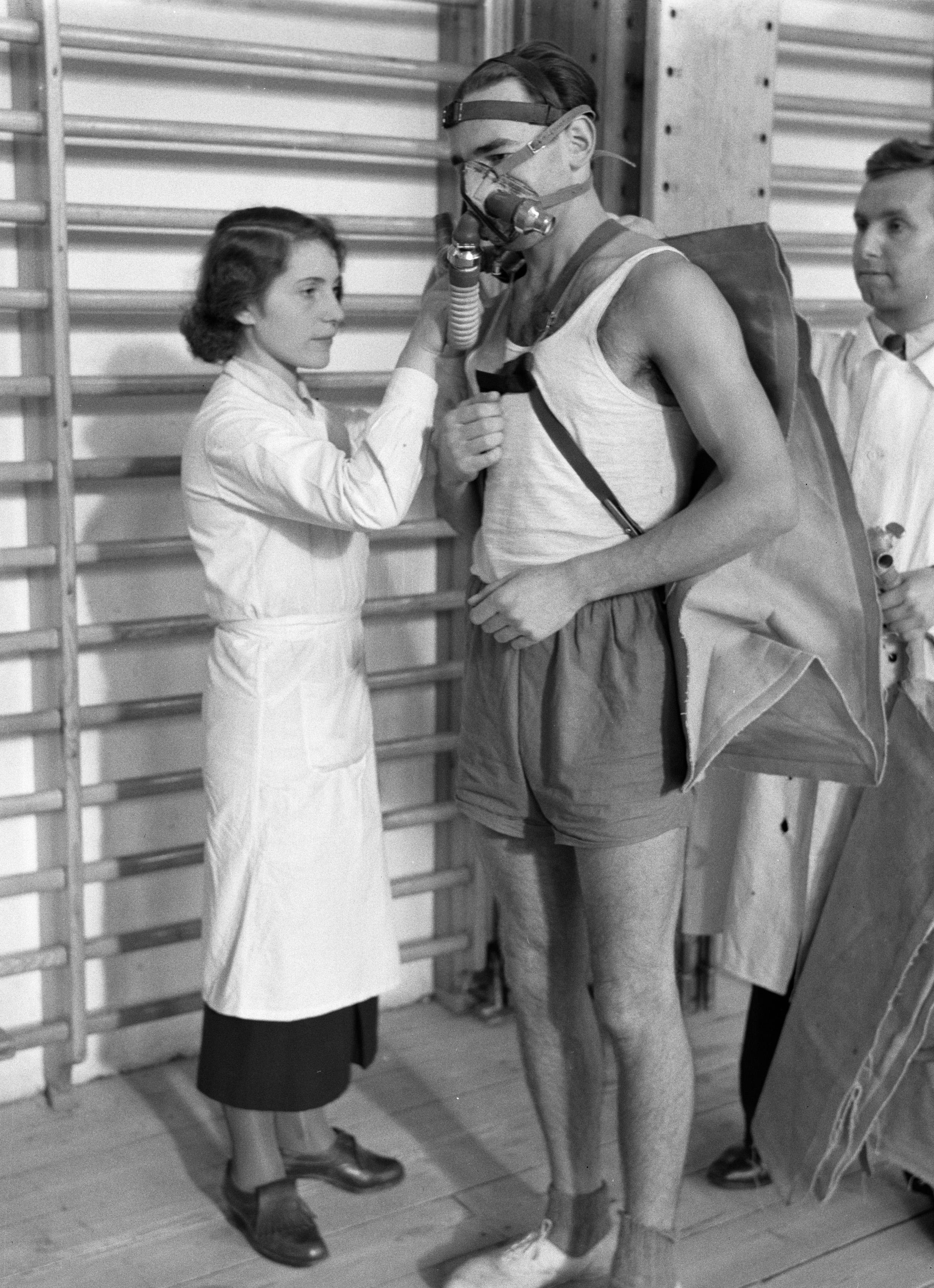
Early experiment in spirometry

Named after early 20th century Polish statesman Józef Piłsudski, it was founded in 1929 as the Central Institute for Physical Exercise. During the communist period (1947–1990) it was renamed to Karol Świerczewski Academy of Physical Education (Akademia Wychowania Fizycznego im. gen. broni Karola Świerczewskiego).

During World War II, pre-war chairman Jerzy Nadolski and six lecturers of the institute were among Poles murdered by the Russians in the large Katyn massacre in April–May 1940.

Its rector is Bartosz Molik (elected for the 2020–2024 cadence).

Part of the academy is located in Biała Podlaska.
