= Marymont =

Neighbourhood of Warsaw, Poland

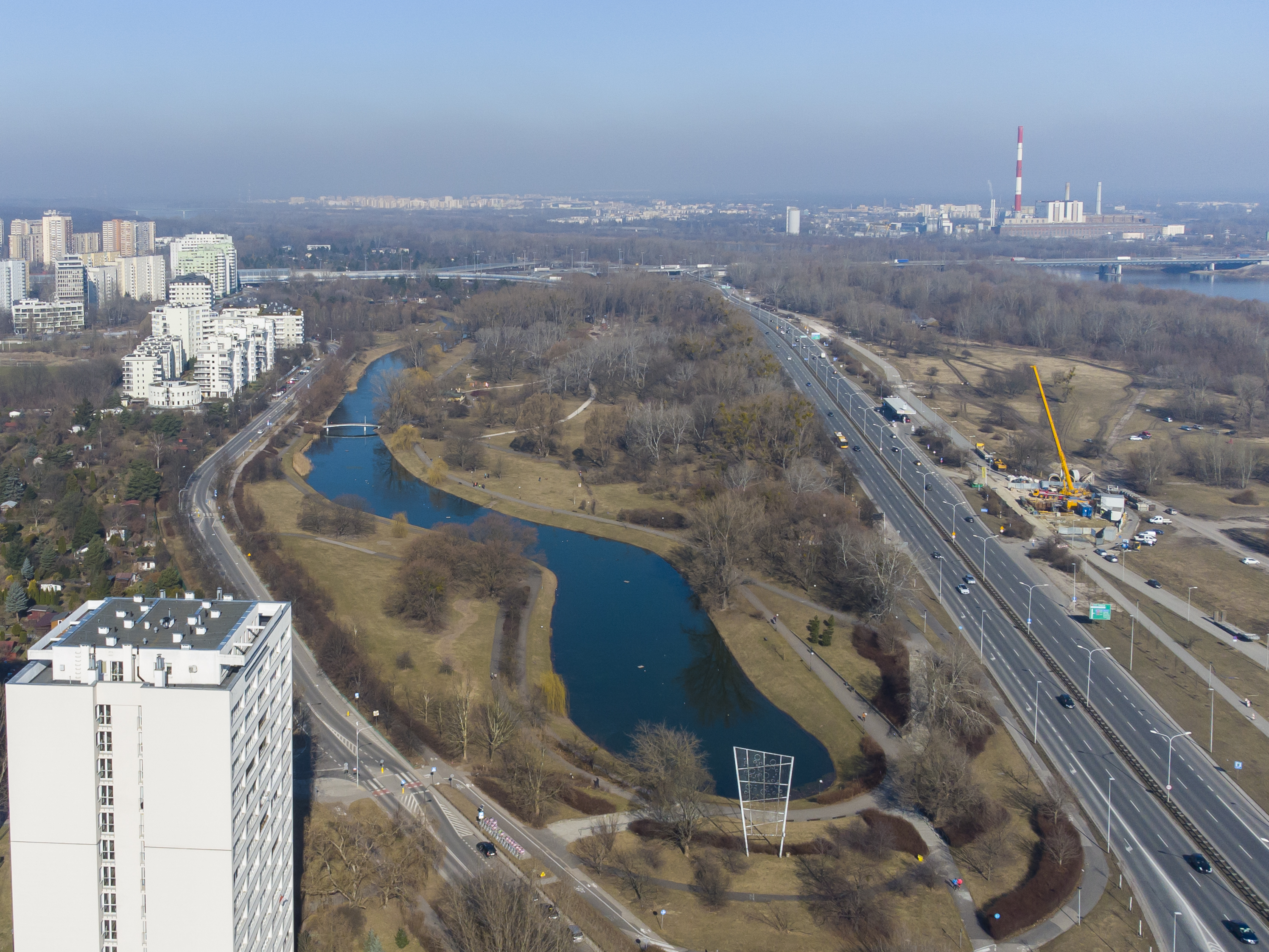
- Aerial view of Kępa Potocka Park in Marymont

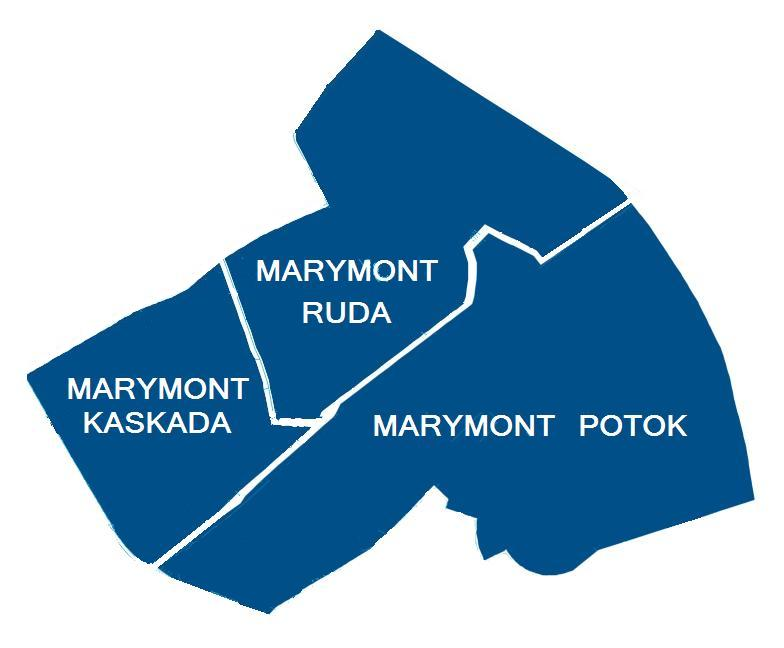
- Modern administrative neighbourhoods of Marymont
- Coordinates: 52°16′30″N 20°58′30″E
- Country: Poland
- Voivodeship: Masovian
- County/City: Warsaw
- Within city limits: 1916
- Time zone: UTC+1 (CET)
  - Summer (DST): UTC+2 (CEST)

Marymont (from French Mont de Marie - Mary's Hill) is one of the northern neighbourhoods of Warsaw, Poland, administratively a part of the boroughs of Żoliborz (Marymont-Potok) and Bielany (Marymont-Kaskada and Marymont-Ruda).

Named after the queen of Poland Marie Casimire, wife of King John III Sobieski, it initially housed a small summer manor, Mariemont Palace. In the 18th century, it became notable for the large number of windmills located there on the high escarpment of the Vistula. In 1828, a textile factory was established in Marymont, however, it was relocated to Żyrardów several years later. In the 19th century, the area became one of the favourite weekend resting places, joined with the city centre by boat communication and a horse tram. In the 1920s, parts of the neighbourhood were built-up with residential areas. The Marymont Warsaw Metro station opened here in December 2006.

== See also ==
- Marywil
- Kazanowski Palace
- Marie Casimire Louise de La Grange d'Arquien
- Pacification of Marymont
