= Żniwiarz Group =

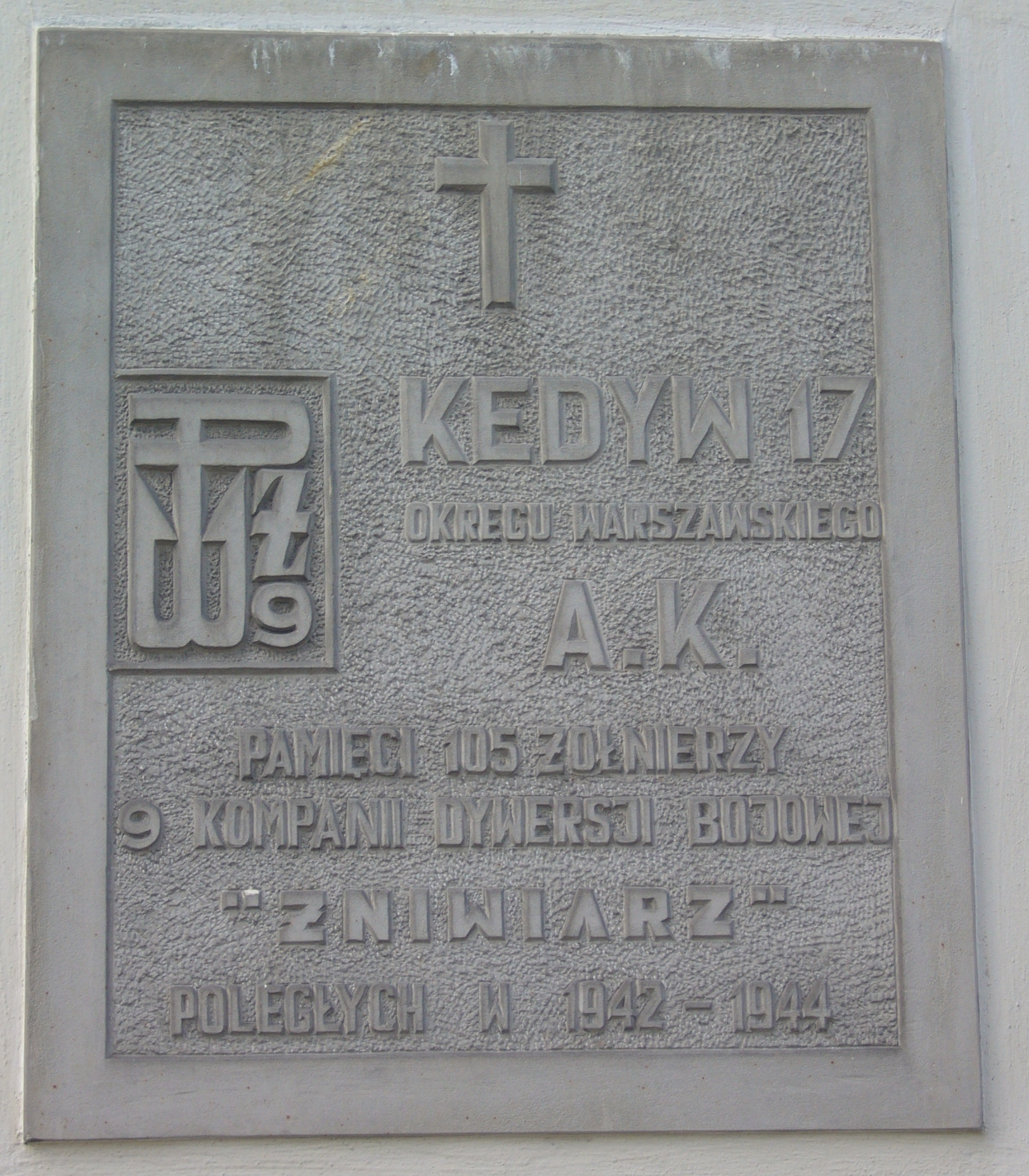
Plaque to commemorate the fallen soldiers of the Żniwiarz Group

The Żniwiarz Group (Polish: Zgrupowanie Żniwiarz) was a group of military units in Żoliborz in Warsaw, Poland, which took part in the Warsaw Uprising of 1944.

The group was created in 1942 and included a group of schoolboys of the Prince Józef Poniatowski Secondary School and youth of Marymont. In the beginning of 1943, upon the creation og Kedyw, it was created the 9th company of military subversion Żniwiarz, which was a military unit at the disposal of the commander of the Sub-district II of Żoliborz (of Armia Krajowa), pseudonym Żywiciel.

== Organisation ==
- Commander - lieutenant Mieczysław Morawski pseudonym "Szeliga";
- 226th platoon - commanded by sec. lieutenant Gustaw Budzyński pseudonym "Szymura";
- 229th platoon - commanded by officer cadet Stanisław Swinarski pseudonym "Poraj";
- 230th platoon - commanded by officer cadet Zygmunt Wisłouch pseudonym "Zarewicz".

== Course of combat in Warsaw Uprising ==
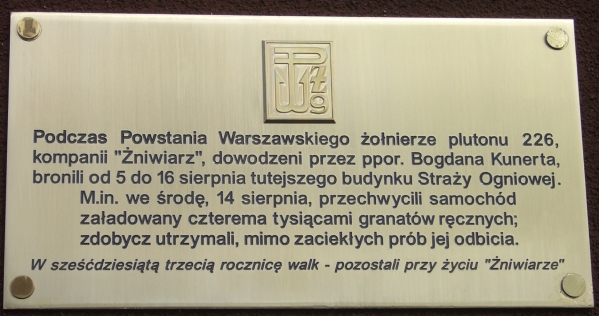
Plaque to commemorate the insurrection fights of the Żniwiarz Group in Marymont

The place of concentration of the Żniwiarz Group at the hour "W" were areas in Mikołaj Górka Street, Józef Sułkowski Street and the Park Promyka in the officer quarter of Żoliborz. About 13:50 soldiers who transported weapons from stores in Wespazjana Kochowskiego Street fired the first shots in the Warsaw Uprising. Although the soldiers won the skirmish, it did not prevent the insurgents from reaching the gathering place. The target of the Żniwiarz Group was German positions in Krasińskiego street and areas of Plac Grunwaldzki.

Upon arriving, the Group soldiers were attacked in the area of Plac Lelewela (Krechowiecka and Cieszkowskiego Streets) and suffered severe losses. During further fights, the units of the group waged heavy fights in Suzina Street and in the Zdobycz Robotnicza quarter. They took part in the attack on Warsaw Gdańsk Station, defended the Opel workshop as well as the insurgent redoubt in a building of Fire Brigades in the crossing of Słowackiego, Gdańska and Potocka streets. The last position of Żniwiarz Group was defending of Słowackiego Street and Plac Wilsona.

Losses included 92 fallen and many wounded.

Among others, Włodzimierz Kaczanowski and Zdzisław Sierpiński fought in units of the Group.
