= 1936 in art =

Events from the year 1936 in art.

== Events ==
- February 15 – Exhibition Abstract and Concrete, curated by Nicolete Gray, opens at 41 St Giles', Oxford, prior to touring England. It is the first showing of abstract art, and of the work of Mondrian, in the country.
- May 27 – RMS Queen Mary begins her maiden Atlantic crossing. Interior design, under the direction of E. C. Leach, is by Arthur Joseph Davis and J. C. Whipp of Mewès & Davis (UK) and Benjamin Wistar Morris (USA) with much craftsmanship undertaken by the Bromsgrove Guild of Applied Arts. Graphic artists commissioned to supply work include Edward Wadsworth and Anna and Doris Zinkeisen.
- June 11–July 4 – London International Surrealist Exhibition, opened by André Breton.
- November – Exhibition Cubism and Abstract Art, curated by Alfred H. Barr, Jr., opens at the Museum of Modern Art, New York.
- Summer – Spanish Civil War breaks out. Photographers Endre Friedmann and Gerda Taro, who have jointly devised the name Robert Capa, journey from Paris to cover it. The Second Spanish Republic appoints Pablo Picasso as "director of the Prado, albeit in absentia" and he arranges for evacuation of its principal paintings.
- November 23 – Margaret Bourke-White's photographs of the construction of the Fort Peck Dam are featured in the first issue of Life magazine.
- December 1 – Members of the Artists Union occupy the New York City offices of the Federal Art Project; police arrest 219 of them, the largest-ever arrest in the city at this date.
- Naum Gabo settles in London.

== Works ==
- Walter Seymour Allward – Canadian National Vimy Memorial
- Balthus – André Derain (Museum of Modern Art, New York City)
- Robert Capa – The Falling Soldier (Loyalist Militiaman at the Moment of Death, Cerro Muriano, September 5, 1936; photograph)
- Winston Churchill – The Loup River, Alpes Maritimes
- Salvador Dalí
  - Autumnal Cannibalism
  - Couple with Their Heads Full of Clouds (first version)
  - Lobster Telephone
  - Morphological Echo (two versions)
  - Soft Construction with Boiled Beans (Premonition of Civil War)
- Herndon Davis – The Face on the Barroom Floor (Teller House, Central City, Colorado)
- Paul Delvaux – Procession in Lace
- Thomas Cantrell Dugdale – The Arrival of the Jarrow Marchers in London
- M. C. Escher – first Regular Division of the Plane drawings
- Walker Evans – Allie Mae Burroughs, Wife of a Cotton Sharecropper, Hale County, Alabama (photograph)
- Charles Hartwell – St Mary-le-bone War Memorial with sculpture of St George and the Dragon, London (bronze)
- Bernhard Hoetger – Lichtbringer (relief over entrance to Böttcherstraße, Bremen)
- Sylvia Shaw Judson – Bird Girl (bronze)
- Harry Kernoff – In Davy's Parlour Snug: Self portrait with Davy Byrne and Martin Murphy
- Henryk Kuna – Alina, a Girl with a Jug (bronze, Warsaw)
- Dorothea Lange – Migrant Mother (photograph of Florence Owens Thompson)
- Carl Milles – Indian God of Peace (onyx)
- Joan Miró – series
  - Metamorphosis
  - Paintings on masonite
- Ronald Moody – Johanaan (elm wood carving)
- Méret Oppenheim – Objet: Le Déjeuner en fourrure
- Pablo Picasso - Minotaur with a dead mare in front of a cave
- Joseph Pollia – General Philip Henry Sheridan (bronze statue, New York City)
- Georges Rouault - "The Old King"
- Diego Rivera – Indian Spinning
- David Alfaro Siqueiros - Collective Suicide
- Charles Sheeler – City Interior
- James Walker Tucker – Hikers
- Edward Weston – Nude (Charis, Santa Monica) (photograph)

== Awards ==
- Archibald Prize: W B McInnes – Dr. Julian Smith
- Dame Laura Knight becomes the first woman elected to the Royal Academy

== Births ==
- January 11 – Eva Hesse, German-born American sculptor (d. 1970)
- January 23 – Willoughby Sharp, American author, curator and critic (d. 2008)
- February 16 – Gillian Wise, English abstract artist (d. 2020)
- February 29 – Frank Bowling, Guyana-born British abstract artist
- March 23 – Jannis Kounellis, Greek-born artist (d. 2017)
- April 1 – Dhiraj Choudhury, Indian painter (d. 2018)
- May 10
  - Timothy Birdsall, English cartoonist and illustrator (d. 1963)
  - Isaac Witkin, South African sculptor (d. 2006)
- May 12 – Frank Stella, Italian American painter (d. 2024)
- May 15 – Ralph Steadman, English illustrator and caricaturist
- June 1 – Gerald Scarfe, English political cartoonist, illustrator and animator
- June 15 – Edward Avedisian, American abstract painter (d. 2007)
- June 27 – Tadanori Yokoo, Japanese graphic designer, illustrator, printmaker and painter
- July 13 – Joan Jonas, American visual artist, pioneer of video and performance art
- July 28 – Victor Moscoso, Spanish graphic artist
- August 1 – Yves Saint Laurent, French fashion designer (d. 2008)
- August 12 – Hans Haacke, German conceptual artist working in the United States
- August 29 – Richard Haas, American muralist
- September 14
  - Terence Donovan, English photographer (d. 1996)
  - Lucas Samaras, Greek-born American photographer and sculptor
- October 13 – Robert Ingpen, Australian illustrator
- November 5 – William Christenberry, American photographer and conceptual artist (d. 2016)
- November 29 – Gregory Gillespie, American magic realist painter (d. 2000)
- December 5 – Robert Freeman, English photographer and designer (d. 2019)
- Full date unknown
  - Marko Stupar, Serbian artist living and working in France from 1964
  - Abu Taher, Bangladeshi expressionist painter (d. 2020)
  - Jon Thompson, English artist and teacher (d. 2016)

== Deaths ==
- February 25 – Anna Boch, Belgian painter (b. 1848)
- March 8 – Victor Noble Rainbird, English painter, stained glass artist and illustrator (b. 1887)
- March 18 – W. Herbert Dunton, American Western painter, member of the Taos art colony (b. 1878)
- April 21 – Ottó Baditz, Hungarian painter (b. 1849)
- July 7 – Heinrich Hoerle, German constructivist artist (b. 1895)
- July 10 – Carl von Marr, American-born German painter (b. 1858)
- October 12 – Edwin Blashfield, American painter and muralist (b. 1848)
- November 12 – Patrick Henry Bruce, American Cubist painter (b. 1881)
- Alexander Fisher, English silversmith and enamel painter (b. 1864)
- Donald Maxwell, English illustrator and travel writer (b. 1877)

== See also ==
- 1936 in fine arts of the Soviet Union
