= Stefan Żeromski Park =

Stefan Żeromski Park may refer to:

- Stefan Żeromski Park (Kołobrzeg), an urban park in Kołobrzeg, Poland
- Stefan Żeromski Park (Kraków), an urban park in Kraków, Poland
- Stefan Żeromski Park (Szczecin), an urban park in Szczecin, Poland
- Stefan Żeromski Park (Warsaw), an urban park in Warsaw, Poland
