= Joanna Dunham =

English actress (1936–2014)

- Born: 6 May 1936; Luton, Bedfordshire, England
- Died: 25 November 2014 (aged 78)
- Education: Royal Academy of Dramatic Art
- Occupations: Actress, painter
- Spouse(s): Henry A. Osborne (m. 1961; div. 1972) Reggie Oliver (m. 1992–2014)
- Parent(s): Peter Browning Dunham (father); Constance Amy Margareta Young (mother)

Joanna Elizabeth Dunham (6 May 1936 – 25 November 2014) was an English actress, best noted for her work on stage and television. She also appeared in several major films.

== Career ==
Dunham was born in Luton, Bedfordshire, the daughter of Peter Browning Dunham (1911–1997), an architect and artist, and Constance Amy Margareta (1911-1992; née Young). Her father's aunt was the Impressionist painter Amy Katherine Browning, who married the artist Thomas Cantrell Dugdale.

Dunham was educated at Bedales School, then the Slade School of Art, and in 1956 she attended RADA, the Royal Academy of Dramatic Art, the same year as Susannah York and Brian Epstein, who later became the manager of the Beatles.

Dunham first came to prominence in 1958 when she appeared as Louka in the "Arms and the Man" episode of BBC Sunday Night Theatre. Her acting career in Britain led her to be voted Britain's most promising actress by readers of the Daily Mirror in 1961.

She came to prominence in the United States while playing Juliet in the 1962 Old Vic production of Romeo and Juliet, under the direction of Franco Zeffirelli, during a five-month, 13-city U.S. tour. She was spotted by Marilyn Monroe, who recommended her to director George Stevens for the role of Mary Magdalen in The Greatest Story Ever Told (1965).

As of 1998 Dunham had appeared in at least 45 different television series or productions.

== Filmography ==
Dunham had credited roles in at least seven films:

- The Breaking Point (1961) - Cherry Winlatter
- Dangerous Afternoon (1961) - Freda
- The Greatest Story Ever Told (1965) - Mary Magdalene
- A Day at the Beach (1970) - Tonie
- The House That Dripped Blood (1971) - Alice Hillyer
- Scandal (1989) - Bronwen, Viscountess Astor
- The Hour of the Pig (1993) - Lady Catherine d/Auferre

While working on The Greatest Story Ever Told, the on-site filming of which stretched to over a year, Dunham announced that she was pregnant. Director George Stevens tried to keep her in the production with the use of flattering camera angles and draped costumes. He told an interviewer from Variety, "Well, that Mary Magdalene always was a troublemaker."

== Television ==
In 1964 she appeared in the series The Third Man, episode "Question In Ice".

She appeared as William Tell's sister-in-law, Gretel, in The Adventures of William Tell, notably in "The Shrew" episode (1958).

In 1970, she played murderer Alice Rhodes in the TV series Wicked Women.

In 1972, Dunham appeared in an episode of Sykes (series 1, episode 11 – "Dreams") as Sykes' doctor.

In 1973, Dunham was featured as Penny Burns in an episode of the Thriller, entitled “Possession”.

She appeared as Lucienne Elders in the first episode of the second series of Van der Valk (1977). She later returned as Arlette van der Valk in the third series.

In 1974 she appeared in a two-part episode of the soap opera Rooms for Thames Television, opposite Ray Brooks.

In 1976, she appeared as a guest artist in an episode of Space 1999 entitled “Missing Link”, she played the character Vana. She appeared as Alice Rhodes in an episode of Wicked Women (1970), and as Miss Featherstone in the episode "Goodbye Mrs. Slocombe" in the 10th series of Are You Being Served (1984). She was Jean Gayton in Casting the Runes (1979) for ITV.

== Personal life ==
Dunham was married twice, to Henry A. Osborne (1961–72, ended in divorce) and to Reggie Oliver (1992-her death). She took up painting when her acting career declined, and converted a Suffolk farm building into an art gallery.

== Death ==
Dunham died on 25 November 2014, aged 78.
