= Stefan Żeromski Park (Warsaw) =

Urban park in Warsaw, Poland

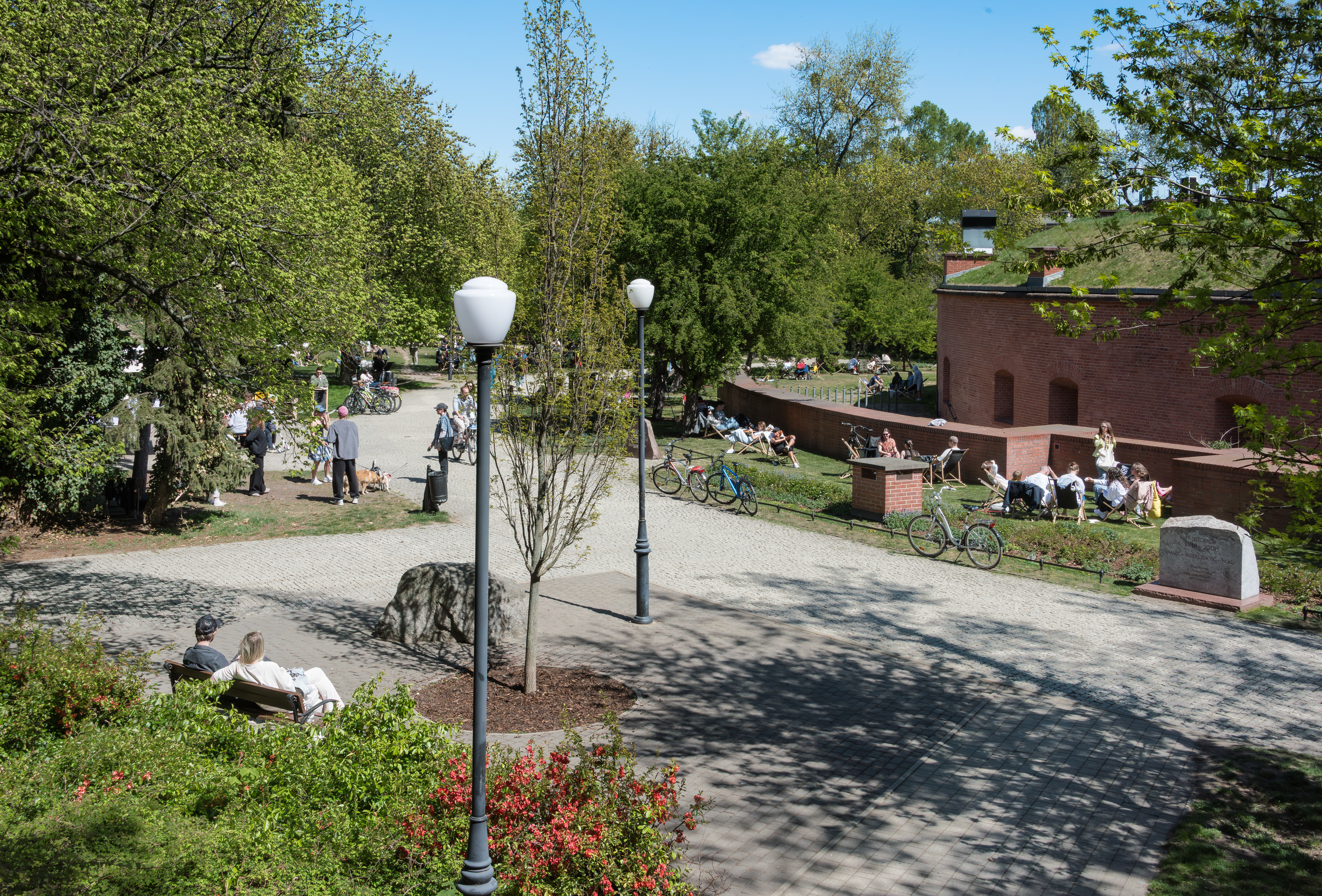
- The Stefan Żeromski Park in 2026.
- Interactive map of Stefan Żeromski Park
- Type: Urban park
- Location: Żoliborz, Warsaw, Poland
- Coordinates: 52°16′06.6″N 20°59′19.1″E
- Area: 6 hectares (15 acres)
- Created: 23 June 1932
- Designer: Leon Danielewicz; Stanisław Zadora-Życieński

The Stefan Żeromski Park (Polish pronunciation: [ˈstɛ.fan ʐɛˈrɔm.ski]; Polish: Park Stefana Żeromskiego) is an urban park in Warsaw, Poland, within the district of Żoliborz, at the intersection of Krasińskiego and Mickiewicza Streets. It was opened in 1932.

== Name ==
The park is named after Stefan Żeromski, a 19th- and 20th-century novelist and dramatist. Prior to 1926, the bordering Wilson Square was also known as the Stefan Żeromski Square (Polish: Plac Stefana Żeromskiego).

== History ==
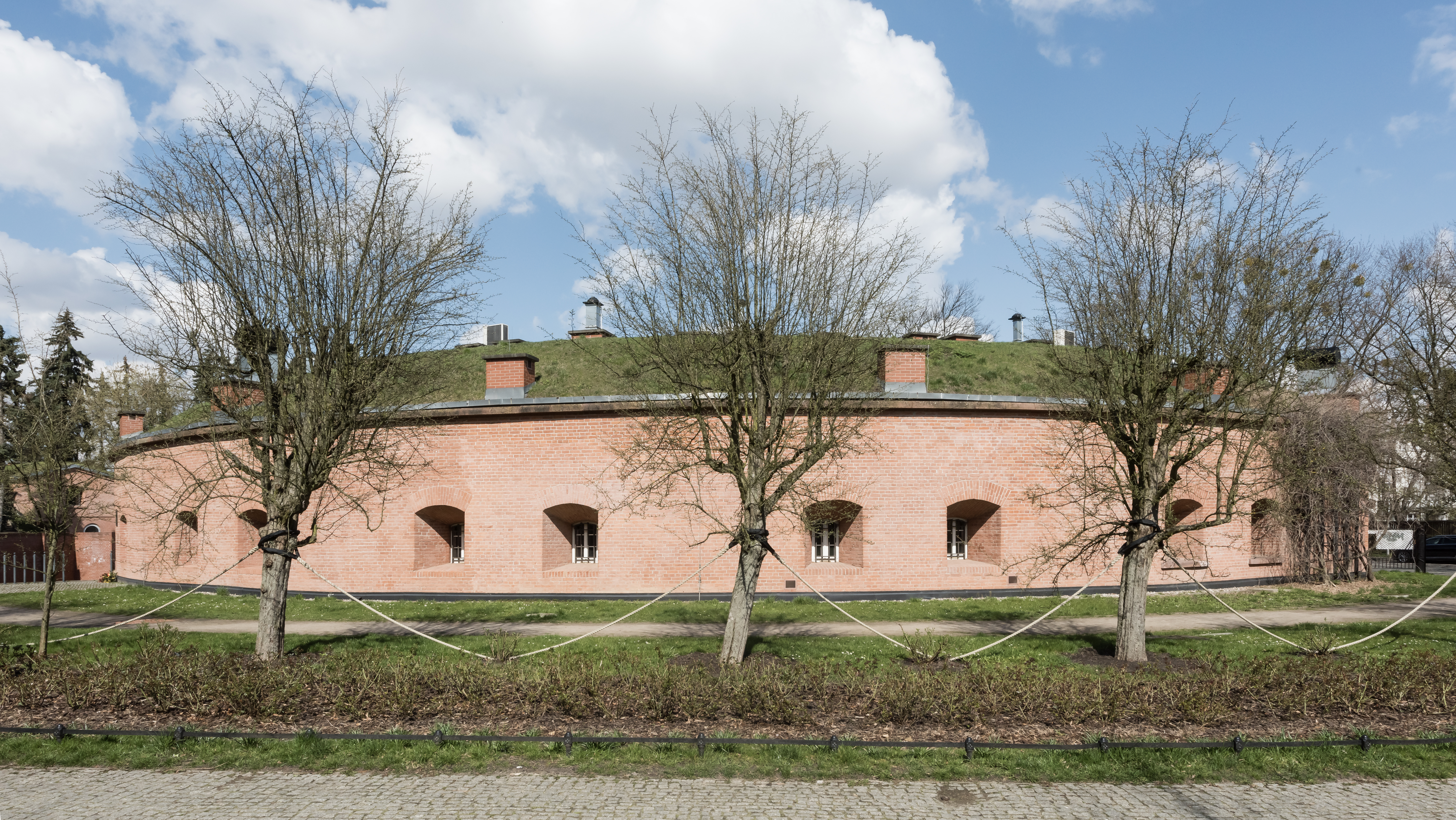
The Sokolnicki Fort in the Żeromski Park, constructed in 1851. Photography made in 2023.

Between 1849 and 1851, in the location of the current park, was constructed the Sokolnicki Fort (originally known as the Sergei Fort), which was part of the Warsaw Citadel. It was expanded further between 1864 and 1874, and was mainly used as a police building and prison.

The park was constructed between 1925 and 1932, on the initiative of the Friends of Żoliborz Association. It was designed by Leon Danielewicz and Stanisław Zadora-Życieński. The park was mostly financed by the state, which employed around 600 people for its construction, to combat the furthering unemployment situation. The remaining costs were covered by the membership fees of the Friends of Żoliborz Association. The park was constructed around the Sokolnicki Fort, and its ramparts and moats were incorporated into its landscape. The main entrance was placed at the Wilson Square, and the remaining ones, at Krasińskiego Street and Mierosławskiego Street. The park was opened on 23 June 1932. In 1933, a rock with engraved inscription was placed there, commemorating the 15th anniversary of the independence of Poland.

In 1936, near the main entrance was unveiled the statue Alina, a Girl with a Jug by Henryk Kuna, which became a popular symbol of Żoliborz.

In September 1939, during the Siege of Warsaw in the Second World War, the park became a provisional cemetery. In May 1943, it was closed to the civilian population. During the Warsaw Uprising in 1944, the Sokolnicki Fort was used as a field hospital. The park was partially destroyed in the conflict and rebuilt after its end.

In 1990, the statue Alina, a Girl with a Jug was stolen by unknown perpetrators, most likely between 27 and 28 October. It was found a year later buried in the ground in Olszynka Grochowska, and broken into several parts. It was restored and unveiled in its original location on 17 June 1992. Later it was also given honorary citizenship of Żoliborz.

Between 2003 and 2005, the park underwent a renovation and remodeling, with the project designed by Marek Szeniawski and Wojciech Trzópek, and based on the original plans. Among the changes, a large playground and a monument commemorating the 75th anniversary of the independence of Poland were added. In 2018, a monument commemorating the 100th anniversary was also placed there.

Since 2020, the park has the status of a protected cultural property.

In 2022, the Sokolnicki Fort was turned into a cultural centre.

== Characteristics ==
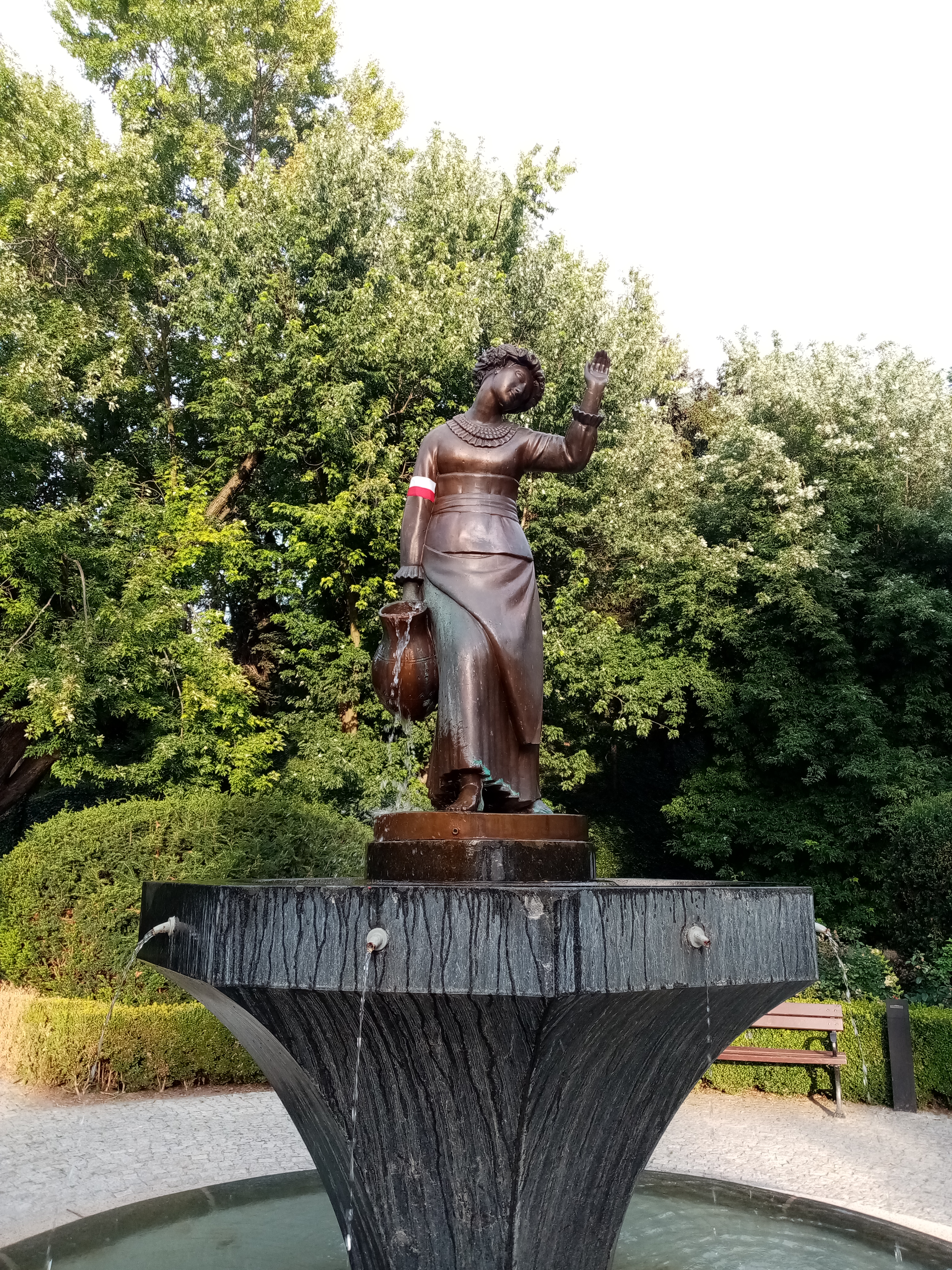
The statue Alina, a Girl with a Jug in 1936. Photography made in 2021.

The park is located in the district of Żoliborz, within the neighbourhood of Old Żoliborz, between Wilson Square, Krasińskiego Street, Mickiewicza Street, Mierosławskiego Street, and the buildings at Czarnieckiego Street. Its main entrance was placed at the Wilson Square, and the remaining ones, at Krasińskiego Street and Mierosławskiego Street. The park has a total area of 6 ha, and a varied landscape, corresponding to the former ramparts and moats of fortifications in the area.

In its centre is located the Sokolnicki Fort, a 19th-century historical fortification building, currently used as a cultural centre.

At the main entrance is placed the statue Alina, a Girl with a Jug by Henryk Kuna, dating to 1936. It depicts a woman holding a jug, placed on a fountain. The sculpture is a popular and well-regarded symbol of Żoliborz. In the park are also located a few memorial stones commemorating:

- the 15th anniversary of the independence of Poland (1918–1933);
- the 75th anniversary of the independence of Poland (1918–2004);
- the 100th anniversary of the independence of Poland (1918–2018);
- Jacek Kuroń (1934–2004), a politician and anti-communist activist, who lived near the park.

The park has the status of a protected cultural property.

== Gallery ==
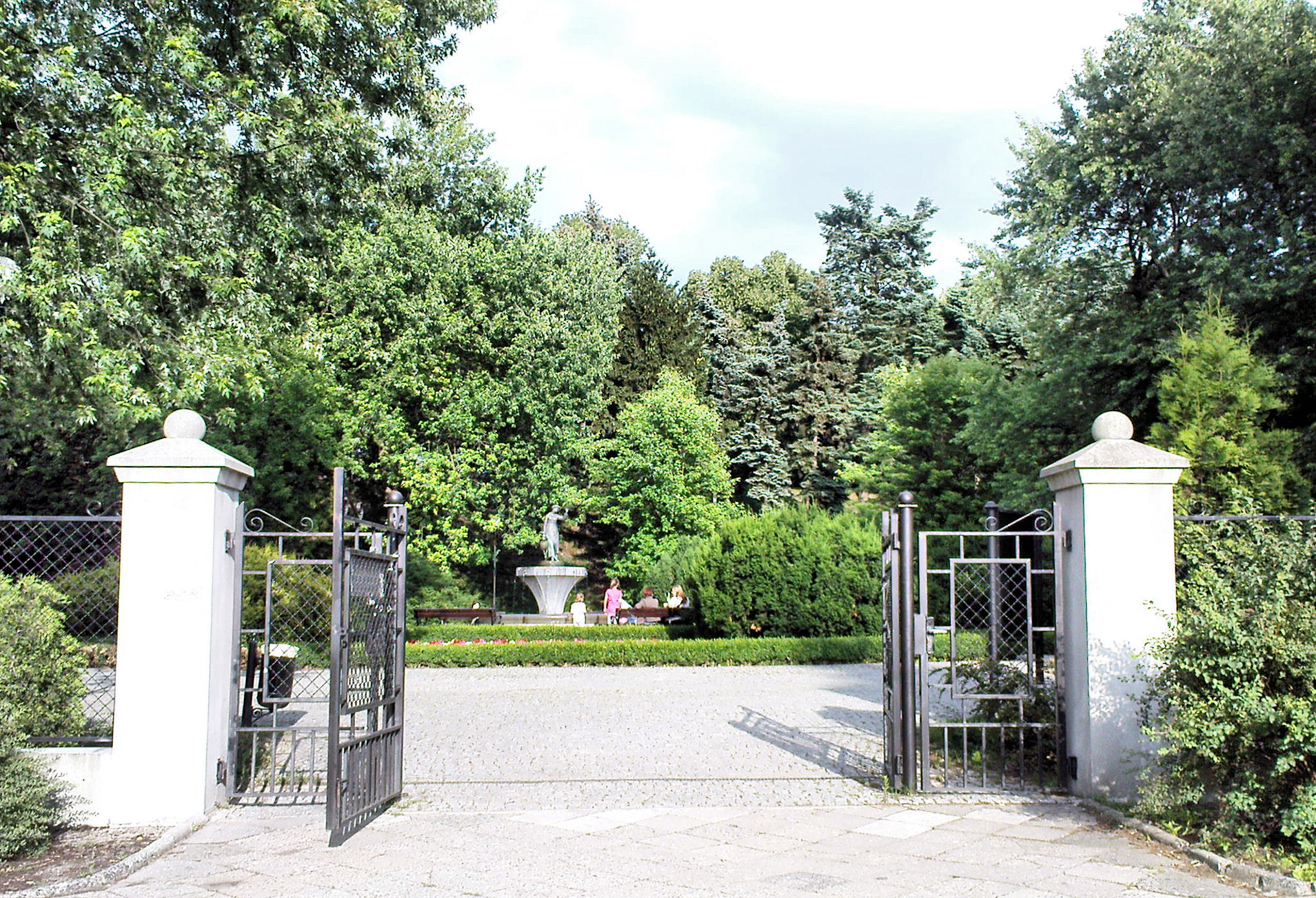
The main entrance to the park in 2012.

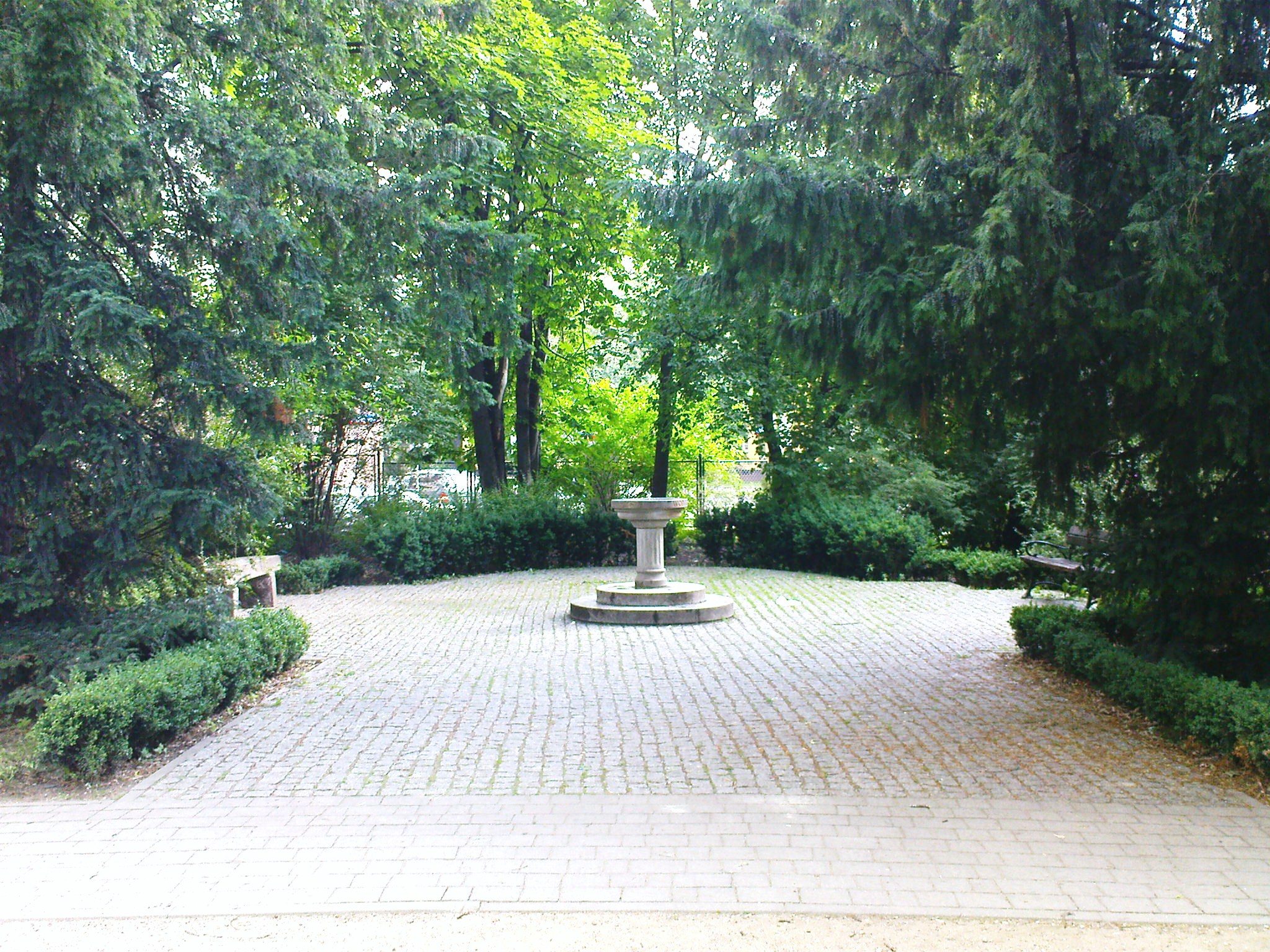
A historical bird bath in the park in 2012.

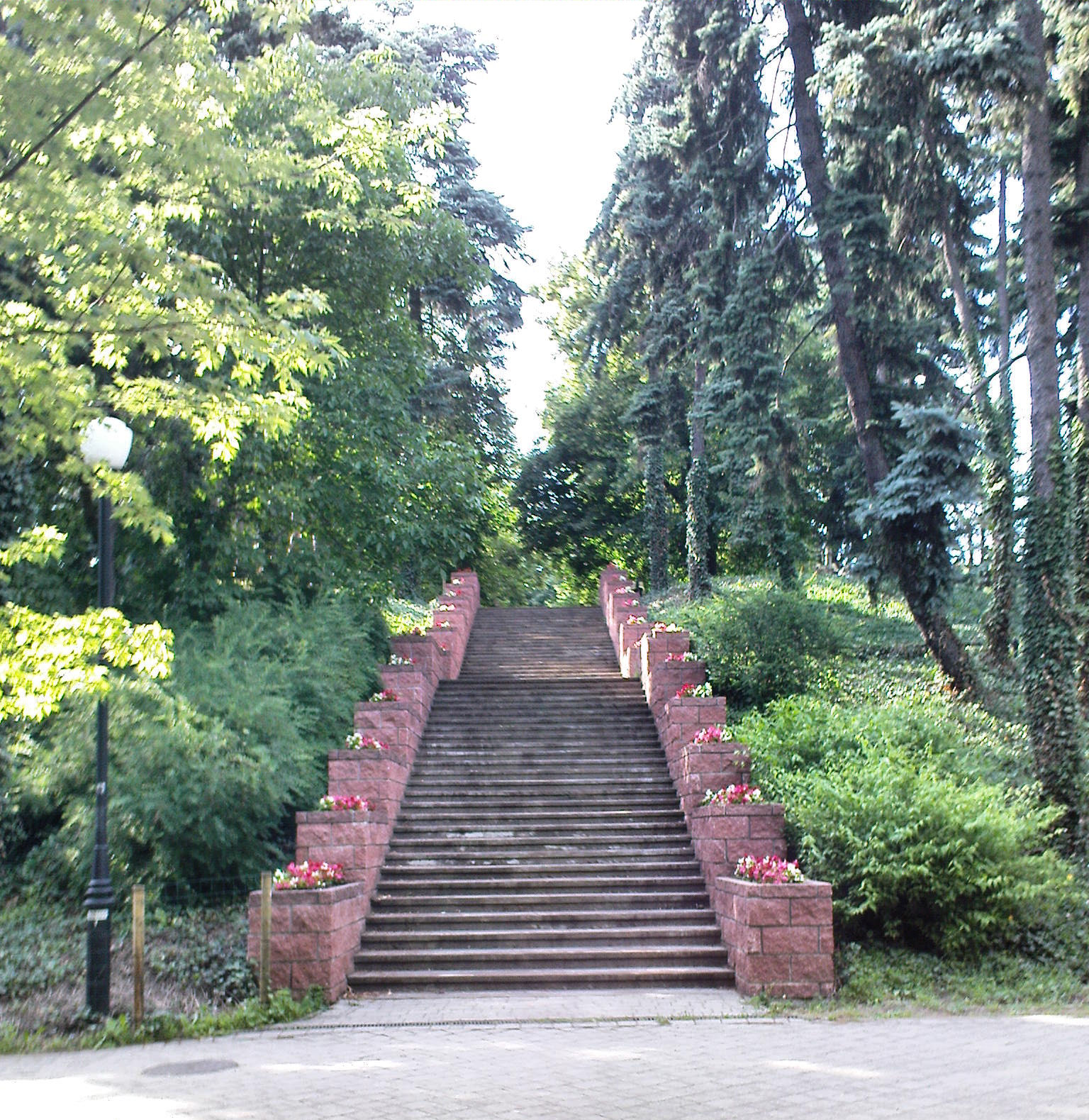
Historical stairs in the park in 2012.

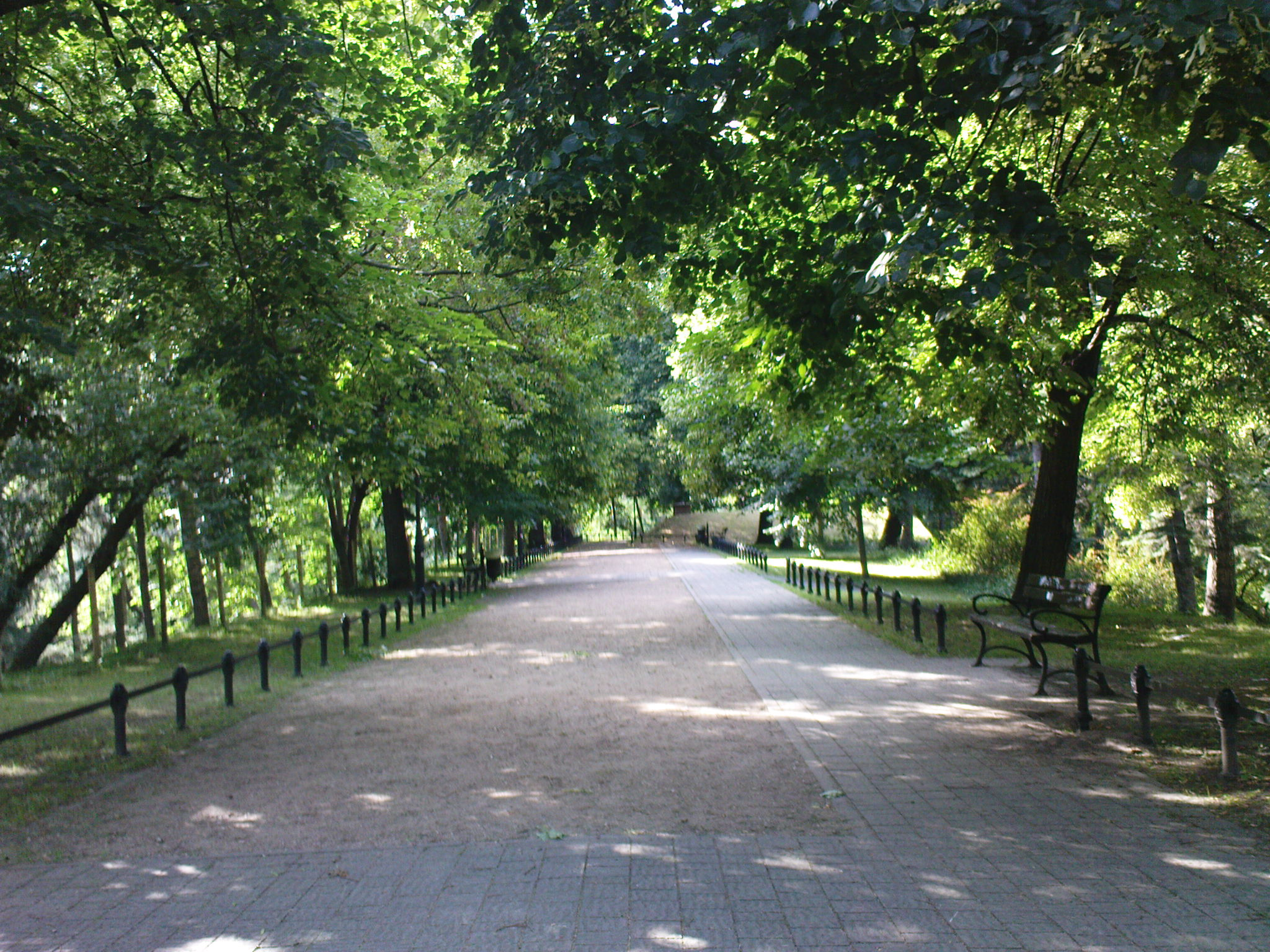
One of the avenues of the park in 2012.

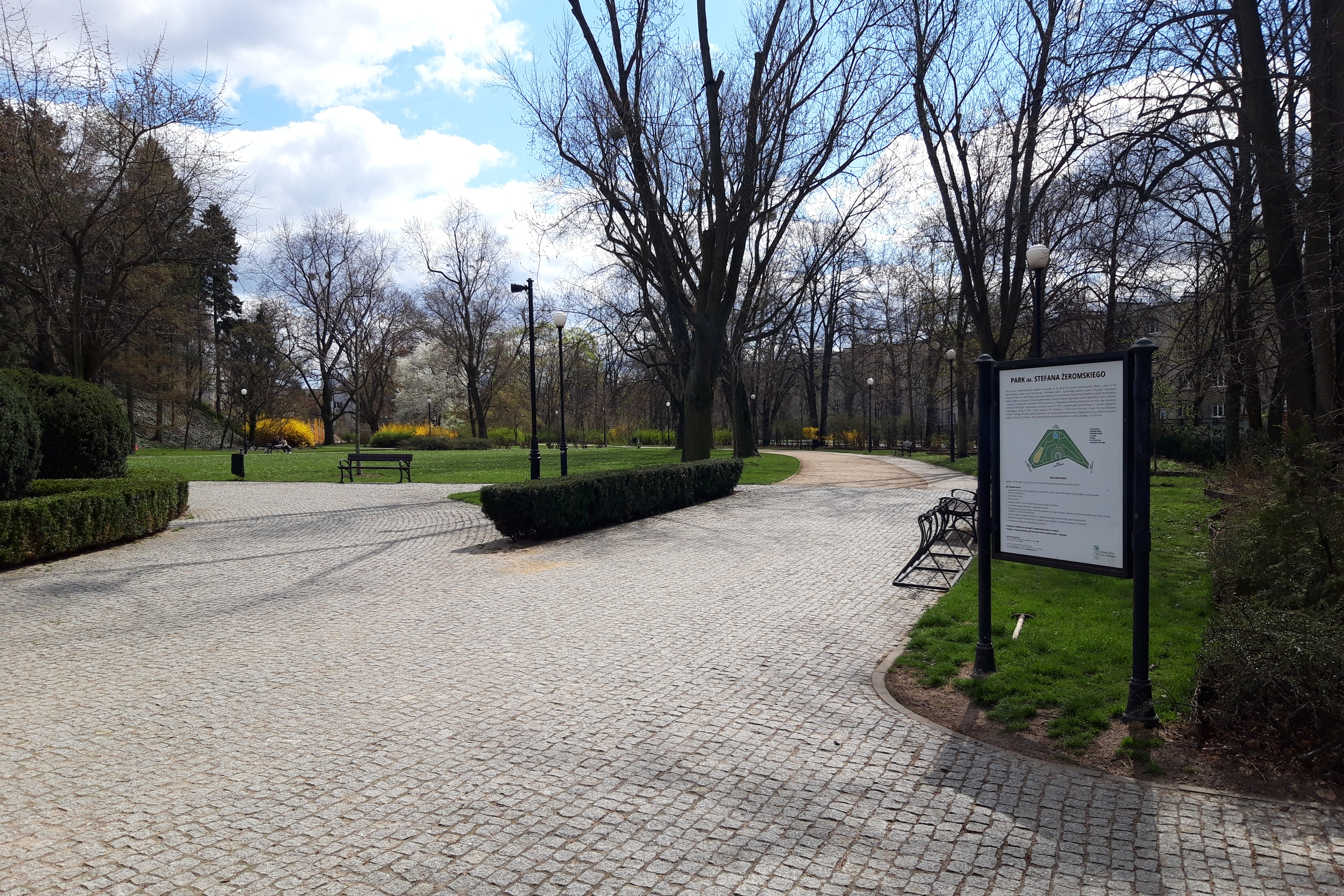
A portion of the park near its main entrance in 2022.

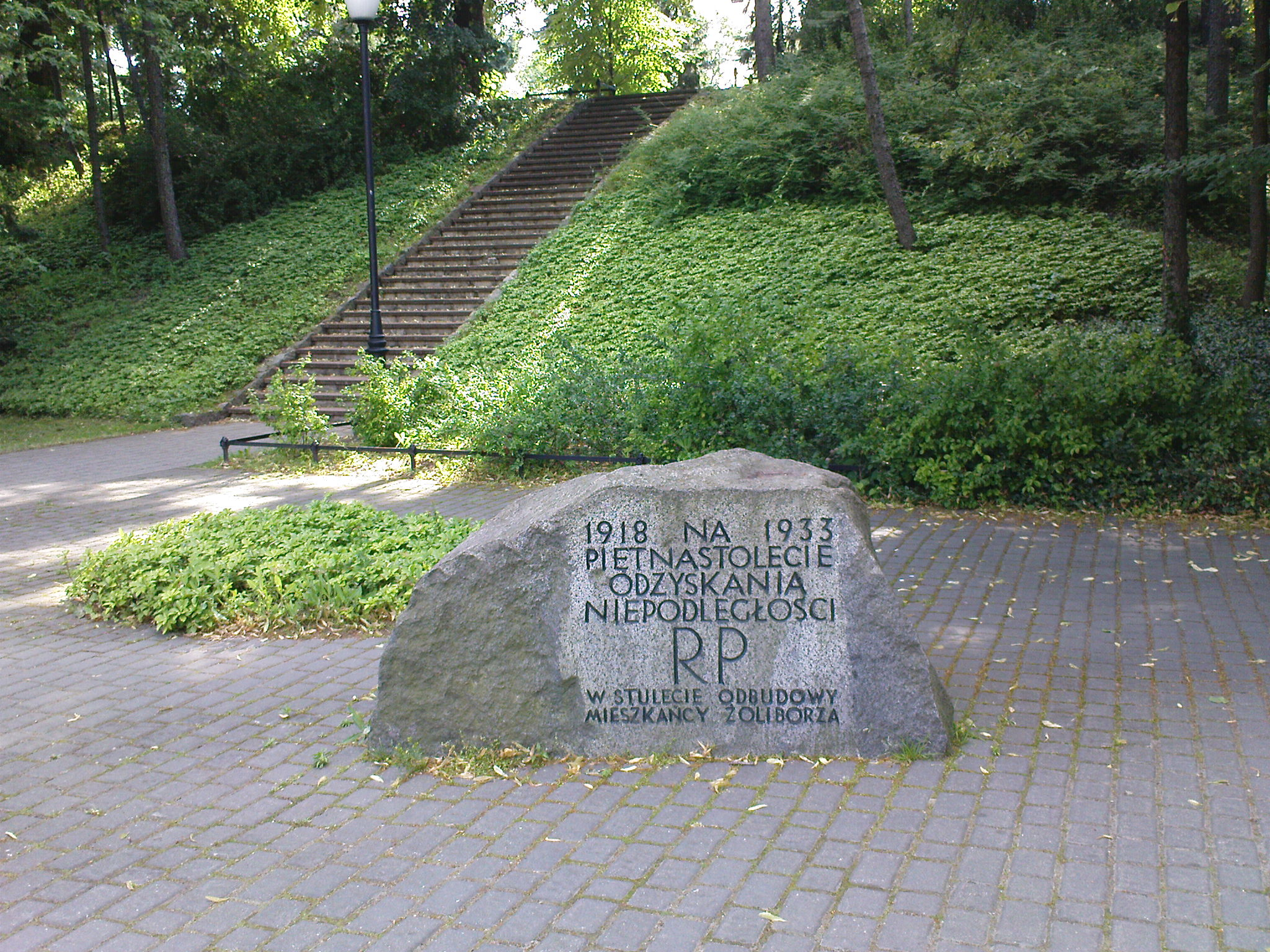
A stone commemorating the 15th anniversary of the independence of Poland.

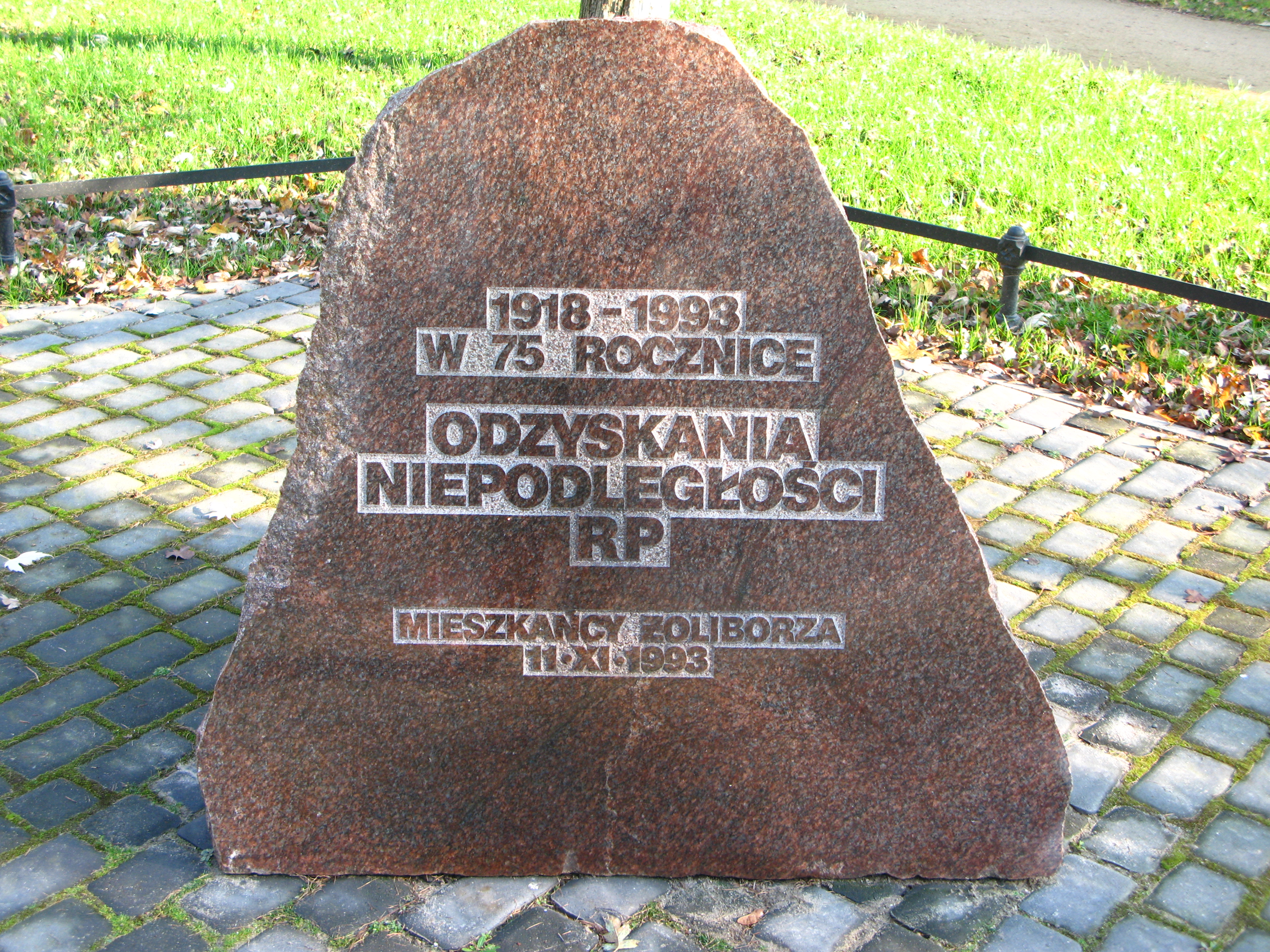
A stone commemorating the 75th anniversary of the independence of Poland.

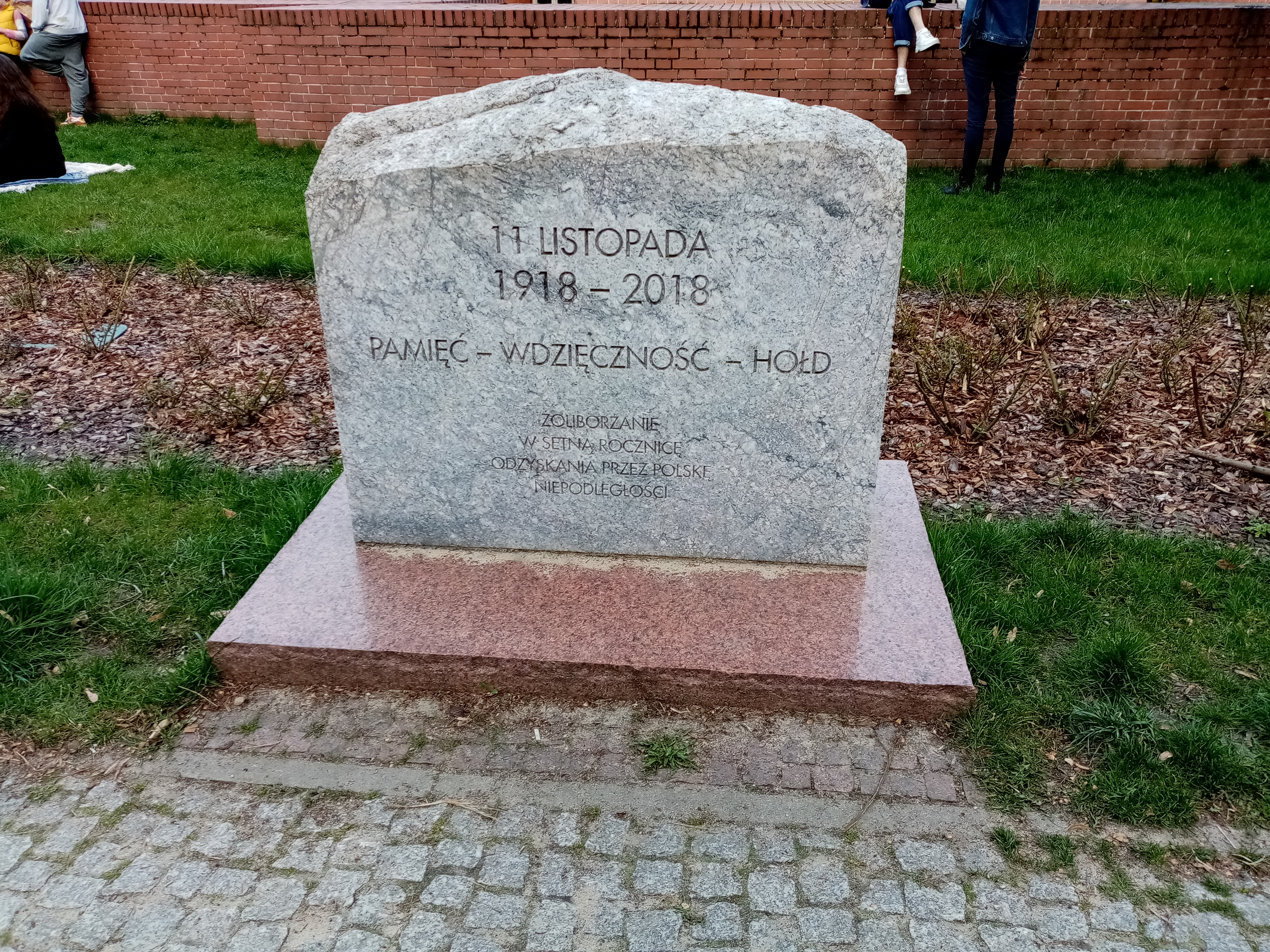
A stone commemorating the 100th anniversary of the independence of Poland.

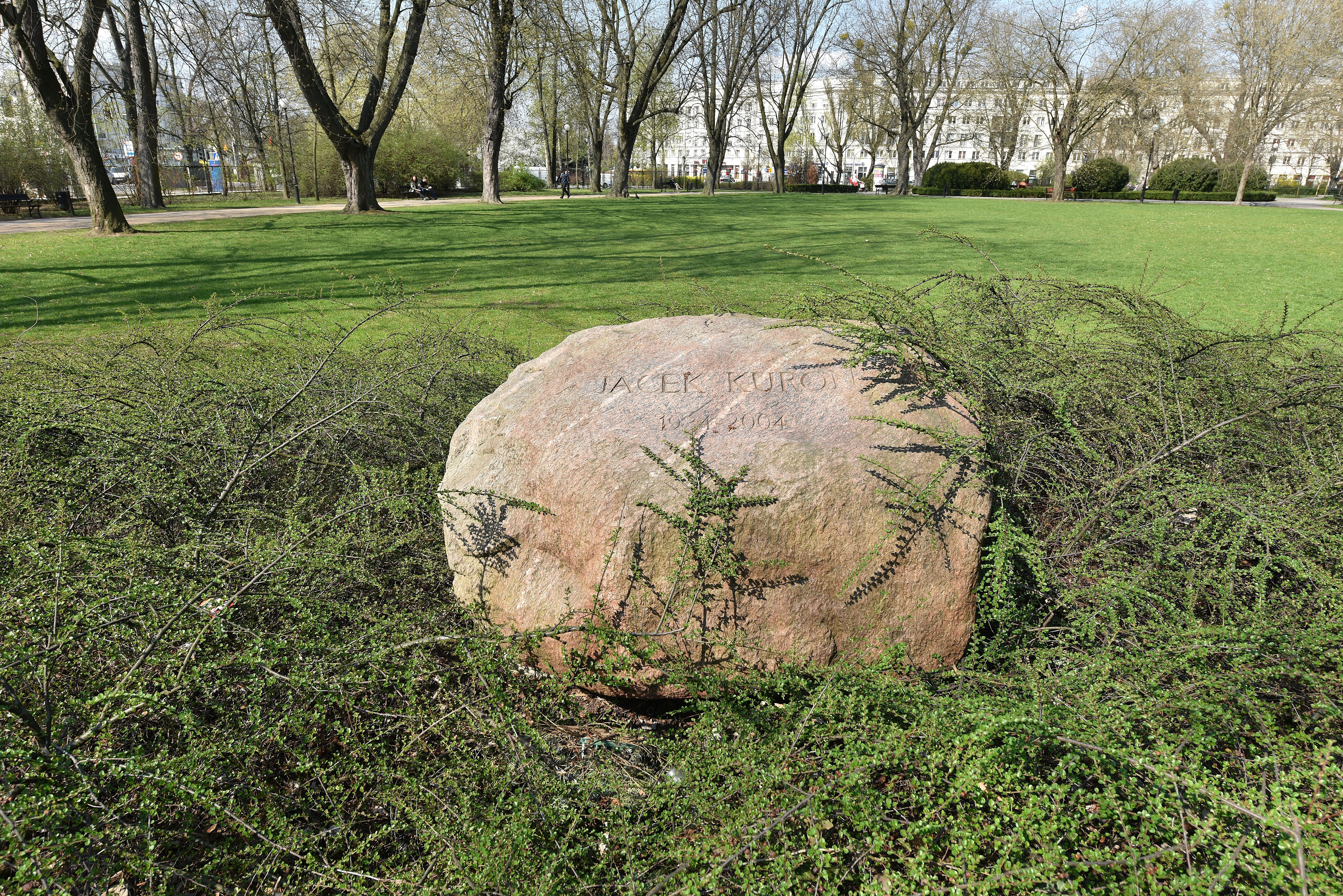
A stone commemorating Jacek Kuroń.
