= Alina, a Girl with a Jug =

Statue in Warsaw, Poland

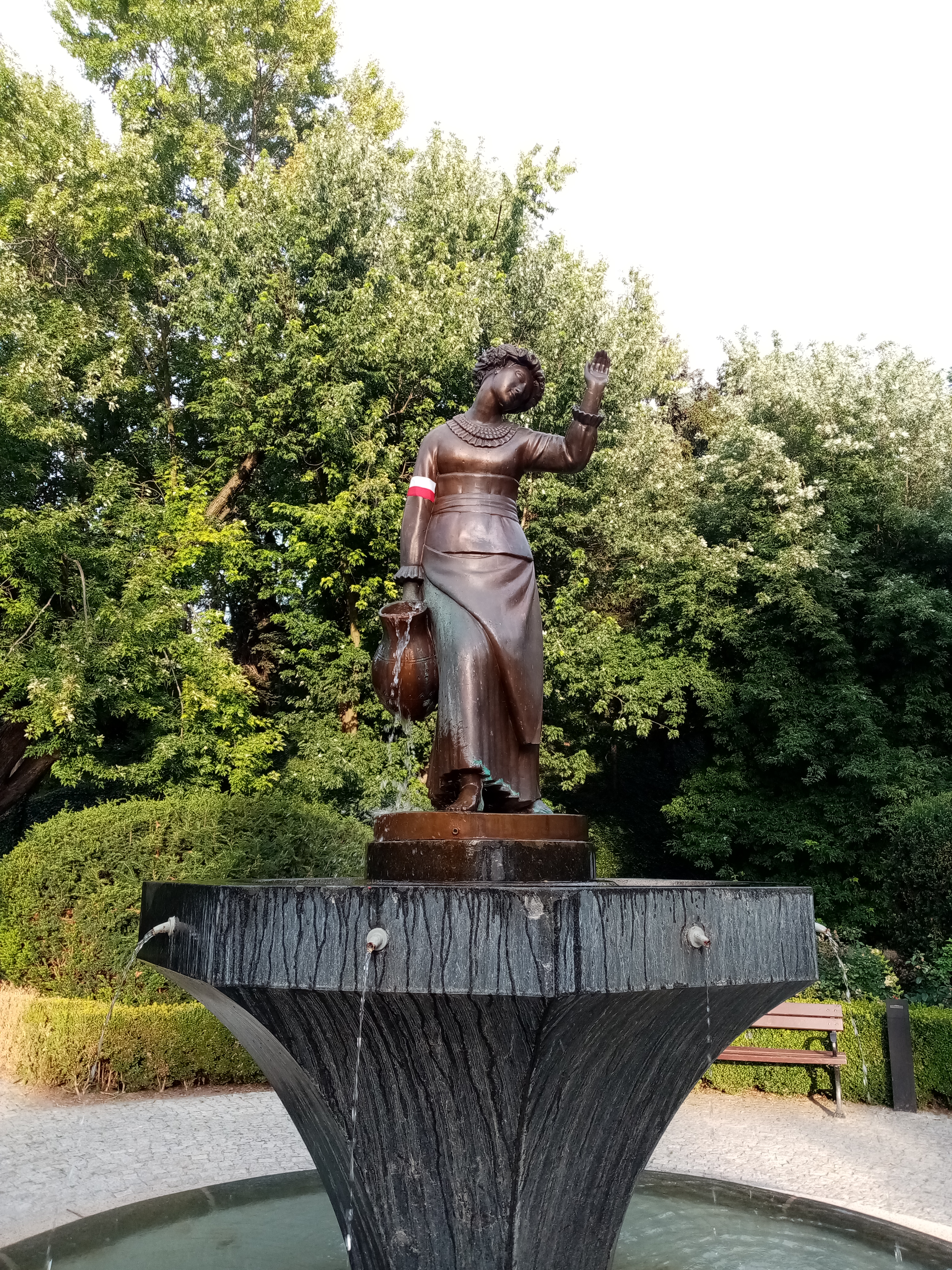
- Alina, a Girl with a Jug in 2021.
- Interactive map of Alina, a Girl with a Jug
- Location: Stefan Żeromski Park, Warsaw, Poland
- Coordinates: 52°16′06.89″N 20°59′16.77″E
- Designer: Henryk Kuna
- Type: Statue
- Height: 1.6 m (5.25 ft.)
- Completion date: 1936
- Restored date: 17 June 1992

Alina, a Girl with a Jug (Polish pronunciation: [aˈli.na]; Polish: Alina, dziewczyna z dzbanem), also simply known as Alina, and as Girl with a Jug (Polish: Dziewczyna z dzbanem), is a bronze statue located in the Stefan Żeromski Park in Warsaw, Poland. It was made by Henryk Kuna and unveiled in 1936. The sculpture depicts a woman holding a jug, and is placed on top of a fountain. It is commonly regarded as a symbol of the district of Żoliborz.

== History ==
The sculpture Alina, a Girl with a Jug was made by Henryk Kuna and unveiled in 1936 at the main entrance of the Stefan Żeromski Park in Warsaw. It was named after the main character of the 1834 drama Balladyna by Juliusz Słowacki. It became a popular symbol of the Żoliborz district.

In 1989, the sculpture entered onto a heritage list. In 1990, it was stolen by unknown perpetrators, most likely between 27 and 28 October. It was found a year later, buried in the ground in the neighbourhood of Olszynka Grochowska, and broken into several parts. It was restored and unveiled in its original location on 17 June 1992. Later, it was also given the honorary citizenship of Żoliborz.

In 1997, a replica of the statue was made for the art exhibition Żoliborz. Obrazy z dziejów. Afterwards, it was moved to the Żoliborz Town Hall at 6 Słowackiego Street.

== Characteristics ==
The bronze sculpture is placed on top of a fountain at the main entrance of the Stefan Żeromski Park. It has a form of a statue of a woman in a dress, holding a jug in her right hand. Together with the fountain, it masseurs of 1.6 m (5.25 ft.) The sculpture is regarded as a symbol of the Żoliborz district, and it has the status of its honorary citizen, as well as a protected cultural property.

Its replica is also displayed in the Żoliborz Town Hall at 6 Słowackiego Street.
