= The Greatest Story Ever Told =

1965 film by George Stevens

- Theatrical release poster
- Directed by: George Stevens
- Screenplay by: George Stevens; James Lee Barrett
- Based on: The Greatest Story Ever Told; 1949 novel by Fulton Oursler; Henry Denker; Bible
- Produced by: George Stevens
- Starring: Max von Sydow; Michael Anderson Jr.; Carroll Baker; Ina Balin; Pat Boone; Victor Buono; Richard Conte; Joanna Dunham; José Ferrer; Van Heflin; Charlton Heston; Martin Landau; Angela Lansbury; Janet Margolin; David McCallum; Roddy McDowall; Dorothy McGuire; Sal Mineo; Nehemiah Persoff; Donald Pleasence; Sidney Poitier; Claude Rains; Gary Raymond; Telly Savalas; Joseph Schildkraut; Paul Stewart; Harold J. Stone; John Wayne; Shelley Winters; Ed Wynn; Inbal Dance Theater of Israel
- Cinematography: Loyal Griggs; William C. Mellor
- Edited by: Harold F. Kress; Argyle Nelson Jr. Frank O'Neil
- Music by: Alfred Newman
- Production company: George Stevens Productions
- Distributed by: United Artists
- Release date: February 15, 1965 (United States)
- Running time: 199 minutes (see below)
- Country: United States
- Language: English
- Budget: $20 million
- Box office: $15.5 million

The Greatest Story Ever Told is a 1965 American epic religious film that retells the Biblical account of Jesus of Nazareth, from the Nativity through to the Ascension. Produced and directed by George Stevens, the film features an ensemble cast and includes the final film performances of Claude Rains and Joseph Schildkraut.

The origins of The Greatest Story Ever Told trace back to a half-hour radio series in 1947, inspired by the four canonical Gospels. The series was later adapted into a 1949 novel by Fulton Oursler. In 1954, 20th Century-Fox acquired the film rights to Oursler's novel, but development stalled for several years. In November 1958, Stevens joined the project, agreeing to write and direct. However, in September 1961, Fox withdrew due to concerns over the film's projected cost and its thematic similarities to King of Kings (1961), another religious biopic about Jesus.

A few months later, Stevens moved the project to United Artists. He opted to film in the Southwestern United States rather than the Middle East, and principal photography began on October 29, 1962. Filming fell behind schedule due to Stevens' meticulous shooting techniques, prompting David Lean and Jean Negulesco to assist with some sequences. Production concluded on August 1, 1963.

The film premiered at the Warner Cinerama Theatre in New York City on February 15, 1965, receiving a polarized response from critics. It was also a box office disappointment, earning $15.5 million against a $20 million budget. Despite this, it received five Academy Award nominations.

== Plot ==
=== Act I ===
The film opens with Three Wise Men following a celestial star to Jerusalem, seeking the prophesied newborn King of the Jews. Summoned by the paranoid King Herod, they reveal the Messiah’s birth, foretold to occur in Bethlehem. Herod secretly dispatches spies to track the child. The Magi find Mary and Joseph in a humble stable, and they present gifts to their infant son, Jesus. Warned by an angel, the family flees to Egypt just before Herod orders the slaughter of Bethlehem’s male infants. Herod dies shortly after, and the family returns to Nazareth.

Years later, Judea chafes under Roman rule. Herod Antipas, now tetrarch of Galilee, dismisses messianic hopes while the prophet John the Baptist preaches repentance at the Jordan River. Jesus, now an adult, arrives to be baptized by John, then retreats to the wilderness. There, he resists three temptations by a mysterious Dark Hermit, embodying spiritual evil. Returning to Galilee, Jesus gathers disciples—including fishermen Peter, Andrew, John, and the skeptical Judas Iscariot—promising to make them “fishers of men.”

As Jesus teaches through parables and performs miracles like healing a crippled man, crowds grow. In Capernaum, he recruits the tax collector Matthew, while Pharisees and priests grow alarmed. Herodias, wife of Herod Antipas, manipulates her husband into arresting John the Baptist for denouncing her marriage as adulterous. Meanwhile, Jesus’s fame spreads: he spares Mary Magdalene from stoning, heals a hemorrhaging woman, and feeds 5,000 with scant loaves.

In Nazareth, Jesus faces rejection when locals demand proof of his divinity. Later, he resurrects his friend Lazarus in Bethany, stunning onlookers and confirming fears among Jerusalem’s leaders. Herod, learning Jesus survived his father’s massacre, executes John and orders Jesus’s arrest.

=== Act II ===
Preparing for death, Jesus accepts anointing by Mary Magdalene, then rides into Jerusalem hailed as a king. Enraged by commercial desecration of the Temple, he drives out merchants, further alienating the Pharisees. At the Last Supper, Jesus predicts Judas’s betrayal and Peter’s denials, instituting the Eucharist. Judas flees to conspire with priests for thirty pieces of silver.

Arrested in Gethsemane after Judas’s kiss, Jesus endures a biased trial before the Sanhedrin, where false witnesses, including the healed Aram, testify. Pontius Pilate, pressured by mobs, sends Jesus to Herod Antipas, who mocks him. Returned to Pilate, Jesus is condemned when crowds demand Barabbas’s release. Crucified alongside thieves Dimas and Gestas, Jesus forgives his executioners, entrusts Mary to John, and dies as darkness shrouds Golgotha.

A guilt-ridden Judas dies by suicide (in this movie, burns himself alive by stepping into a blazing sacrificial pyre in the Temple courtyard as opposed to more common, Biblical method of his suicide, which is hanging on a tree), while Jesus’s body is entombed by Joseph of Arimathea. Guards seal the tomb, but on the third day, Jesus rises, appearing to disciples and Mary Magdalene. Though Thomas doubts, Jesus’s ascension to heaven culminates in the Great Commission, charging followers to spread his teachings. The film closes with the Hallelujah Chorus as Jesus’s image merges into celestial light.

== Cast ==
- Max von Sydow as Jesus
- Dorothy McGuire as the Virgin Mary
- Charlton Heston as John the Baptist
- Claude Rains as Herod the Great
- José Ferrer as Herod Antipas
- Telly Savalas as Pontius Pilate
- Martin Landau as Caiaphas
- David McCallum as Judas Iscariot
- Gary Raymond as Peter
- Donald Pleasence as "The Dark Hermit"
- Michael Anderson Jr. as James the Less
- Roddy McDowall as Matthew
- Joanna Dunham as Mary Magdalene
- Joseph Schildkraut as Nicodemus
- Van Heflin as "Bar Amand"
- Sal Mineo as "Uriah"
- Ed Wynn as "Old Aram"
- Sidney Poitier as Simon of Cyrene

Smaller credited roles (some appearing for only a few seconds) were played by Michael Ansara, Carroll Baker, Ina Balin, Robert Blake, Pat Boone, Victor Buono, John Considine, Richard Conte, John Crawford, Cyril Delevanti, Jamie Farr, David Hedison, Russell Johnson, Angela Lansbury, Mark Lenard, Robert Loggia, John Lupton, Janet Margolin, Nehemiah Persoff, Marian Seldes, David Sheiner, Abraham Sofaer, Paul Stewart, Harold J. Stone, Michael Tolan, John Wayne, and Shelley Winters. Richard Bakalyan and Marc Cavell, in uncredited roles, played the thieves crucified with Jesus.

== Production ==
=== Development ===
The Greatest Story Ever Told originated in 1947 as a half-hour radio series written by Henry Denker and inspired by the four canonical Gospels. In 1949, the series was adapted into a novel by Fulton Oursler, a senior editor at Reader's Digest. In May 1954, 20th Century-Fox chairman Darryl F. Zanuck acquired the film rights to Oursler's novel for a down payment of $110,000, plus a percentage of the gross. Denker wrote a draft of the script, but the studio did not move the project into production. When Zanuck left Fox in 1956, the project was abandoned. In September 1958, Philip Dunne briefly became involved with the project, after signing on as a producer.

In November 1958, while George Stevens was filming The Diary of Anne Frank (1959) at Fox, he became aware that the studio owned the rights to the Oursler property. Stevens then founded a company, "The Greatest Story Productions", to film the novel. The studio set an initial production budget of $10 million, twice the previous largest figure. That same month, another religious biopic titled King of Kings (1961) was in development, helmed by producer Samuel Bronston. Spyros Skouras, the studio president of 20th Century-Fox, had tried and failed to purchase the project from Bronston and Metro-Goldwyn-Mayer (MGM), which had agreed to distribute the film. In June 1960, Fox resigned from the Motion Picture Association of America (MPAA), partly because of the similarity between the two films.

In June 1960, Denker sued Fox to reclaim the film rights and for $2.5 million of damages, claiming the studio had failed to release the film before the end of 1959. When Denker and Oursler's estate sold the rights to Fox, Denker had placed a clause in the contract dictating the agreement. In September 1961, Fox announced it had "indefinitely postponed" the project. Skouras refused to explain the reasons for canceling the project, but the decision was made after the studio had posted a $13 million loss in the previous year. Variety also reported that in the wake of the not-yet-released King of Kings, starring Jeffrey Hunter as Jesus, several studio board members expressed concern about the eventual production costs. More than $1 million had already been spent on script preparation, and there was no established filming date. The studio agreed to hand over the film rights to Stevens, and was contracted to recoup the costs should the film earn $5 million in profits. That same month, four American film studios—including Magna Theatre Corporation—and two in Europe made offers to finance the film. By November 1961, Stevens had moved the project to United Artists.

=== Writing ===
Before writing the screenplay, Stevens reviewed 36 different translations of the New Testament and compiled an extensive reference book with various clippings of scripture. Stevens and David Brown, a Fox executive, considered numerous screenwriters, including Ray Bradbury, Reginald Rose, William Saroyan, Joel Sayre and Ivan Moffat. Stevens then met with Moffat at the Brown Derby, where Stevens told him his vision for the film would be reverent and universal. Stevens collaborated with him and then with James Lee Barrett. It was the only time Stevens received screenplay credit for a film he directed. It took two years to write the screenplay.

By July 1960, Carl Sandburg had been hired for completion work on the screenplay. Sandburg remained with the project for the next thirteen months, before returning to his residence in Flat Rock, North Carolina. In September 1961, Sandburg told Variety that he would continue to consult on the project "until George Stevens tells me to stop". The contributions Sandburg made included a brief conversation between Judas Iscariot and Mary Magdalene discussing her use of expensive perfume to anoint Jesus; he received screen credit for "creative association". Sandburg also had an uncredited appearance as a Roman citizen who glares at Pontius Pilate when he gives in to the crowd's demand that he crucify Jesus. By November 1961, Stevens had finished writing the script.

Financial excesses grew during pre-production. Stevens commissioned French artist André Girard to prepare 352 oil paintings of Biblical scenes to use as storyboards. Stevens traveled to the Vatican to see Pope John XXIII for advice.

=== Casting ===
Pre-production poster from 1960, with John Wayne as the Centurion

For the role of Jesus, Stevens wanted an actor unknown to international audiences, free of secular and unseemly associations in the mind of the public. In February 1961, Stevens cast Swedish actor Max von Sydow as Jesus. Von Sydow had never appeared in an English-language film and was best known for his performances in Ingmar Bergman's dramatic films. Von Sydow said, "I thought with horror of Cecil B. DeMille and such things as Samson and Delilah and The Ten Commandments. But when I saw the script, I decided that the role of Jesus is absolutely not a religious cliché." It was reported that Elizabeth Taylor would portray Mary Magdalene, while Marlon Brando and Spencer Tracy were considered for the roles of Judas Iscariot and Pontius Pilate, respectively.

In major supporting roles, Dorothy McGuire was cast as Mary, the mother of Jesus; Robert Loggia as Joseph, the (adoptive) father of Jesus; Charlton Heston as John the Baptist; and Telly Savalas as Pontius Pilate. Stevens asked Savalas to shave his head for the role; Savalas did so, and continued shaving his head for the rest of his life. The Greatest Story Ever Told features an ensemble of well-known actors, many in brief, sometimes cameo, appearances; these included Pat Boone, Carroll Baker, David McCallum, Sidney Poitier, Angela Lansbury, Jose Ferrer, Martin Landau, Ed Wynn, and John Wayne as a Roman centurion.

An urban legend states of Wayne delivering his only spoken line in the film, "Truly this man was the Son of God" three times, none of which worked to Stevens's satisfaction. Stevens advised, "Can you give it a little more awe, Duke?" Wayne then repeated, "Aw, truly this man was the Son of God." In 1984, film critic Michael Medved and his brother Harry playfully noted, "It is impossible for those watching the film to avoid the merry game of 'Spot the Star', and the road to Calvary in particular comes to resemble the Hollywood Boulevard 'Walk of Fame'."

=== Filming ===
In late April 1960, Stevens, his son George Jr., and researcher Tony Van Renterghem spent six weeks scouting potential locations for filming in Europe and the Middle East. However, in 1965, Stevens told The New York Times, "Unfortunately some of the landscapes around Jerusalem were exciting, but many had been worn down through the years by erosion and man, invaders and wars, to places of less spectacular aspects." Stevens then decided to film in the United States, explaining, "I wanted to get an effect of grandeur as a background to Christ, and none of the Holy Land areas shape up with the excitement of the American southwest. ... I know that Colorado is not the Jordan, nor is Southern Utah Palestine. But our intention is to romanticize the area, and it can be done better here."

Principal photography began on October 29, 1962, at the Crossing of the Fathers along the Colorado River. The first sequence shot was the baptism of Jesus. The Pyramid Lake in Nevada represented the Sea of Galilee, and Lake Moab in Utah was used to film the Sermon on the Mount. Death Valley in California was filmed for Jesus's 40-day journey into the wilderness. Sections of the film were also shot at Lake Powell, Canyonlands and Dead Horse Point in Utah.

Although filming was initially scheduled to last 20 weeks, the production fell behind schedule due to several reasons. By December 1962, a severe blizzard near the Colorado River brought heavy snowfall onto the set. Stevens refused to postpone shooting until the spring and grabbed a shovel to clear the snow, and ordered the cast and crew to do the same. As customary on his previous films, Stevens ordered more than 30 different camera setups and filmed multiple takes of numerous scenes. Charlton Heston, who was portraying John the Baptist, said that "Stevens would do two or three [takes], but he would devise more different angles from which to cover than you'd think possible. You'd finish a day's work on a scene confident that there was no other possible coverage, yet find yourself there a day or two longer while George explored further ideas."

Meanwhile, interior studio filming was shot at Desilu Culver Studios from June 6 to July 31, 1963. There, forty-seven sets were constructed to represent Jerusalem. In 1963, cinematographer William C. Mellor died of a heart attack during production; Loyal Griggs, who had won an Academy Award for his cinematography on Stevens's 1953 Western Shane, was brought in to replace him.

By the summer of 1963, Stevens had met with United Artists chairman Arthur B. Krim, and agreed to allow other directors to direct several sequences so the film would be finished. Fred Zinnemann contacted David Lean, asking if he would consider directing second unit for two sequences. Lean accepted the offer, to which Stevens suggested he direct the Nativity scenes. Lean declined but he decided to direct the scenes with Herod the Great. Lean cast Claude Rains as Herod the Great. Jean Negulesco instead filmed sequences in the Jerusalem streets and the Nativity scenes.

Filming ended on August 1, 1963, where Stevens had shot over six million feet of Ultra Panavision 70 film. The final production budget had spent nearly $20 million (equivalent to $210 million in 2025) plus additional editing and promotion charges, making it the most expensive film shot in the United States.

=== Music ===
Alfred Newman, who had previously scored The Diary of Anne Frank (1959), composed the musical score, with the assistance of Ken Darby, his longtime collaborator and choral director. The protracted scoring process proved to be an unhappy one. Stevens, under pressure from his financers, made extensive late-stage changes to the edited footage. These edits altered the musical continuity and called for significant rewriting and reorchestration. Other composers, including Fred Steiner and Hugo Friedhofer, were called in to assist.

The post-release editing of the film further disrupted the musical composition. The twin climaxes of Newman's score were his elaborate choral finales to Act 1 (the raising of Lazarus) and Act 2 (the Resurrection of Jesus). Stevens eventually substituted the Hallelujah Chorus from George Frideric Handel's Messiah for both sequences—a choice that was widely ridiculed by critics. The entire experience was recalled by David Raksin as "the saddest story ever told".

== Release ==
The Greatest Story Ever Told premiered on February 15, 1965, 18 months after filming wrapped, at the Warner Cinerama Theatre in New York City. It opened two days later at the Cinerama Dome in Los Angeles and then in Miami Beach. The film opened in Philadelphia and Detroit on March 9, 1965, and an edited version opened on March 10 at the Uptown Theater in Washington, D.C. It also opened on March 10 in Chicago, Cincinnati, and Pittsburgh, and in Boston on March 11. A shorter version was released in February 1967 for its general release in Chicago.

The version that premiered in New York had a running time of 221 to 225 minutes (excluding a 10-minute intermission) per reviews from The New York Times and Variety. The original running time was four hours and 20 minutes (260 minutes).

Twenty-eight minutes were cut for the release of the film in Washington, D.C. to tighten the film without deleting any scenes; these cuts were later made to the other prints. The film was edited further with a running time of 137 to 141 minutes for its general release in the United States. This shortened version removed Jesus's 40-day journey into the wilderness, featuring Donald Pleasence as well as appearances by John Wayne and Shelley Winters.

=== Marketing ===
The marketing campaign included exhibits created for churches and Sunday schools, department stores, primary schools, and secondary schools. The Smithsonian Institution put together a traveling exhibition of props, costumes, and photographs that toured museums around the country. Promotional items made available to groups identified for market segmentation included school study guides, children's books, and a reprint of the original novel by Oursler. Previews of the film were shown to leading industrialists, psychologists, government officials, religious leaders, and officials from the Boy and Girl Scout organizations.

The film was advertised on its first run as being shown in Cinerama. While it was shown on an ultra-curved screen, it was with one projector. True Cinerama required three projectors running simultaneously. A dozen other films were presented this way in the 1960s.

=== Home media ===
The film was released on LaserDisc in 1993, on VHS in 1998, and on DVD in 2001, which featured a three hour, 19 minute (199 minute) version along with a documentary called He Walks With Beauty (2011), which details the film's tumultuous production history. In March 2011, the film was released on Blu-ray, with the same runtime as the DVD version. The Blu-ray version also contains a deleted extended scene during Jesus' crucifixion. In 2014, the film was added to Metro-Goldwyn-Mayer's Best of Family Collection on Blu-ray during the studio's 90th anniversary.

== Reception ==
=== Box office ===
Three weeks after opening at the Warner Cinerama, the film had earned nearly $250,000 in advance ticket sales. Based on the ticket sales and advanced reserve-seating ticket sales before Easter, United States vice president Eugene Picker told Variety that the film "was way ahead of any other previous UA hard-tickets being used up for each group and window sales." One year into its release, the film had earned $12.1 million worldwide, being equally split across domestic and international territories. However, this was far less than the $35–38 million gross needed to break even.

Months after the film's release, United Artists wrote-off 60 percent of the film's negative cost. They later recouped the cost by selling the television rights to NBC for $5 million, in which the film was broadcast for perennial viewing during Easter and Christmastime. Steven D. Greydanus, a film critic for the National Catholic Register, believed the film's inability to connect with audiences discouraged future productions of biblical epics for decades.

=== Critical reception ===
Bosley Crowther of The New York Times described the film as the "world's most conglomerate Biblical picture," with "scenes in which the grandeur of nature is brilliantly used to suggest the surge of the human spirit in waves of exaltation and awe." However, he felt the scenes of Jesus preaching to the multitude were too repetitive and "[t]he most distracting nonsense is the pop-up of familiar faces in so-called cameo roles, jarring the illusion." Robert J. Landry of Variety called the film "a big, powerful moving picture demonstrating vast cinematic resource". He also praised von Sydow's performance, writing he "is a tower of strength and sensitivity". However, he felt Stevens was "not particularly original in his approach to the galaxy of talent, some 60 roles," noting several prominent actors were underused in their cameo appearances. James Powers of The Hollywood Reporter stated: "George Stevens has created a novel, reverent and important film with his view of this crucial event in the history of mankind."

Time magazine wrote: "Stevens has outdone himself by producing an austere Christian epic that offers few excitements of any kind ... Greatest Story is a lot less vulgar [than Cecil B. DeMille's Biblical films], though audiences are apt to be intimidated by its pretentious solemnity, which amounts to 3 hours and 41 minutes' worth of impeccable boredom. As for vigorous ideas, there are none that would seem new to a beginners' class in Bible study." Brendan Gill wrote in The New Yorker: "If the subject matter weren't sacred in the original, we would be responding to the picture in the most charitable way possible by laughing at it from start to finish; this Christian mercy being denied us, we can only sit and sullenly marvel at the energy for which, for more than four hours, the note of serene vulgarity is triumphantly sustained." Shana Alexander, reviewing for Life magazine, stated: "The scale of The Greatest Story Ever Told was so stupendous, the pace was so stupefying that I felt not uplifted but sandbagged." John Simon wrote: "God is unlucky in The Greatest Story Ever Told. His only begotten son turns out to be a bore."

In an interview for The New York Times, Stevens stated, "I have tremendous satisfaction that the job has been done – to its completion – the way I wanted it done; the way I know it should have been done. It belongs to the audiences now ... and I prefer to let them judge." On Rotten Tomatoes, the film has an approval rating of 48% based on 21 reviews, with an average rating of 4.90/10.

=== Awards and nominations ===
Award	Category	Nominee(s)	Result	Ref.
Academy Awards	Best Art Direction – Color	Art Direction: Richard Day, William J. Creber, and David S. Hall; (Note: Posthumous nomination.); Set Decoration: Ray Moyer, Fred M. MacLean, and Norman Rockett	Nominated	
Academy Awards	Best Cinematography – Color	William C. Mellor and Loyal Griggs	Nominated	
Academy Awards	Best Costume Design – Color	Marjorie Best and Vittorio Nino Novarese	Nominated	
Academy Awards	Best Music Score – Substantially Original	Alfred Newman	Nominated	
Academy Awards	Best Special Visual Effects	J. McMillan Johnson	Nominated	
International Film Music Critics Association Awards	Best Re-Release of a Previously Existing Score	Alfred Newman	Nominated	
National Board of Review Awards	Top Ten Films		7th Place	

== See also ==
- List of American films of 1965
- List of Easter films
- Cultural depictions of Jesus
- King of Kings – an earlier film about the life of Jesus, released in 1961 directed by Nicholas Ray with Jeffrey Hunter

== Bibliography ==
- Balio, Tino (2009). United Artists, Volume 2, 1951–1978: The Company That Changed the Film Industry. University of Wisconsin Press. ISBN 978-0-299-23013-5.
- Brownlow, Kevin (1996). David Lean: A Biography. Macmillan. ISBN 978-0-312-14578-1.
- Capua, Michelangelo (2017). Jean Negulesco: The Life and the Films. Jefferson, North Carolina: McFarland. ISBN 978-1-476-66653-2.
- Darby, Ken (1992). Hollywood Holyland: The Filming and Scoring of The Greatest Story Ever Told. Scarecrow Press. ISBN 978-0-810-82509-3.
- Hall, Sheldon (2002). "Selling Religion: How to Market a Biblical Epic". Film History. 14 (2): 170–185. doi:10.2979/FIL.2002.14.2.170. JSTOR 3815620.
- Heston, Charlton (1979). The Actor's Life: Journals, 1956–1976. Pocket Books. ISBN 978-0-671-83016-8.
- Heston, Charlton (1995). In the Arena. New York: Simon & Schuster. ISBN 0-684-80394-1.
- Medved, Harry; Medved, Michael (1984). The Hollywood Hall of Shame. Perigee Books. ISBN 0-399-50714-0.
- Moss, Marilyn Ann (2004). Giant: George Stevens, a Life on Film. University of Wisconsin Press. ISBN 978-0-299-20433-4.
- Munn, Michael (2005). John Wayne: The Man Behind the Myth. New York: Penguin Books. ISBN 978-0-451-21414-0.
- Stevens, Jr., George (2022). My Place in the Sun: Life in the Golden Age of Hollywood and Washington. University Press of Kentucky. ISBN 978-0-813-19541-4.
