= Amy Katherine Browning =

British artist

A. K. Browning
- Browning c. 1947
- Born: Amy Katherine Browning; 31 March 1881; Luton, England
- Died: 27 January 1978 (aged 96); Letchworth, England
- Occupations: Teacher and painter
- Spouse: Thomas Cantrell Dugdale (m. 1916)

Amy Katherine Browning; Amy Dugdale; Amy Katherine Dugdale (31 March 1881 – 27 January 1978) was a British Impressionist painter.

== Life ==
Browning was born in Limbury in the Civil Parish of Luton, in 1881. Her childhood residence, Little Bramingham Farm, is now a residential care home in the town.

Her parents, Katherine Lucy and James Day Browning would have eight children and she was the second. Amy's father was a farm bailiff at the time of her birth. On the 1891 Census he is listed as a Farmer. She entered the Royal College of Art in 1899 but had to leave in 1901 as she was eldest unmarried daughter and her mother was pregnant.

She was the favourite student of Gerald Moira when scholarships allowed her to return to the Royal College. Moira would send her upstairs to teach the male student painters. She left the college in 1906. She had become friends with Sylvia Pankhurst and together they created an art exhibition for the Women's Social and Political Union at the Prince's Skating Club in 1909. They remained friends and they worked to raise money for the poor during the First World War. Meanwhile, she was teaching, but she also had early success with her painting. In 1913 the French government bought Chequered Shade which had taken the silver medal when it was exhibited at the Paris Salon in 1913. The French also bought The Red Shawl. When the Paris Salon restarted after the war she returned and exhibited regularly taking the gold medal once. Browning was also continuing to exhibit regularly at the Royal Academy and at other international locations. She would sign her paintings "A.K.Browning" to avoid any discrimination based on gender.

Browning spent her time teaching to subsidise her painting. She also took commissions including one of Winston Churchill and another of his wife.

The artist was the first woman to be elected to the Royal Society of Portrait Painters. In 1952 her husband, Thomas Cantrell Dugdale, died and she gave up their house in Suffolk and went to live in a flat in Chelsea. By 1954 she was once again working in Luton, on a series of paintings of the Leslie Jones Ltd hat factory. During this period she lived close by at the home of the company's director, Henry Jenkinson, in Weston, Hertfordshire. Several of these paintings are now held by Stockport Heritage Services.

Her great-niece was the actress Joanna Dunham.

== Death and legacy ==
Browning died in Letchworth. She has paintings in Musée Baron Gerard, Bayeux, Luton Museum and Art Gallery, Wolverhampton Museum and Art Gallery, Ipswich Museum and Art Gallery, Kelvingrove Museum and the Royal Academy's collection. Portraits of her are held in the collection of the National Portrait Gallery.
