= Wilson Square =

Urban square in Warsaw, Poland

Thomas Woodrow Wilson Square
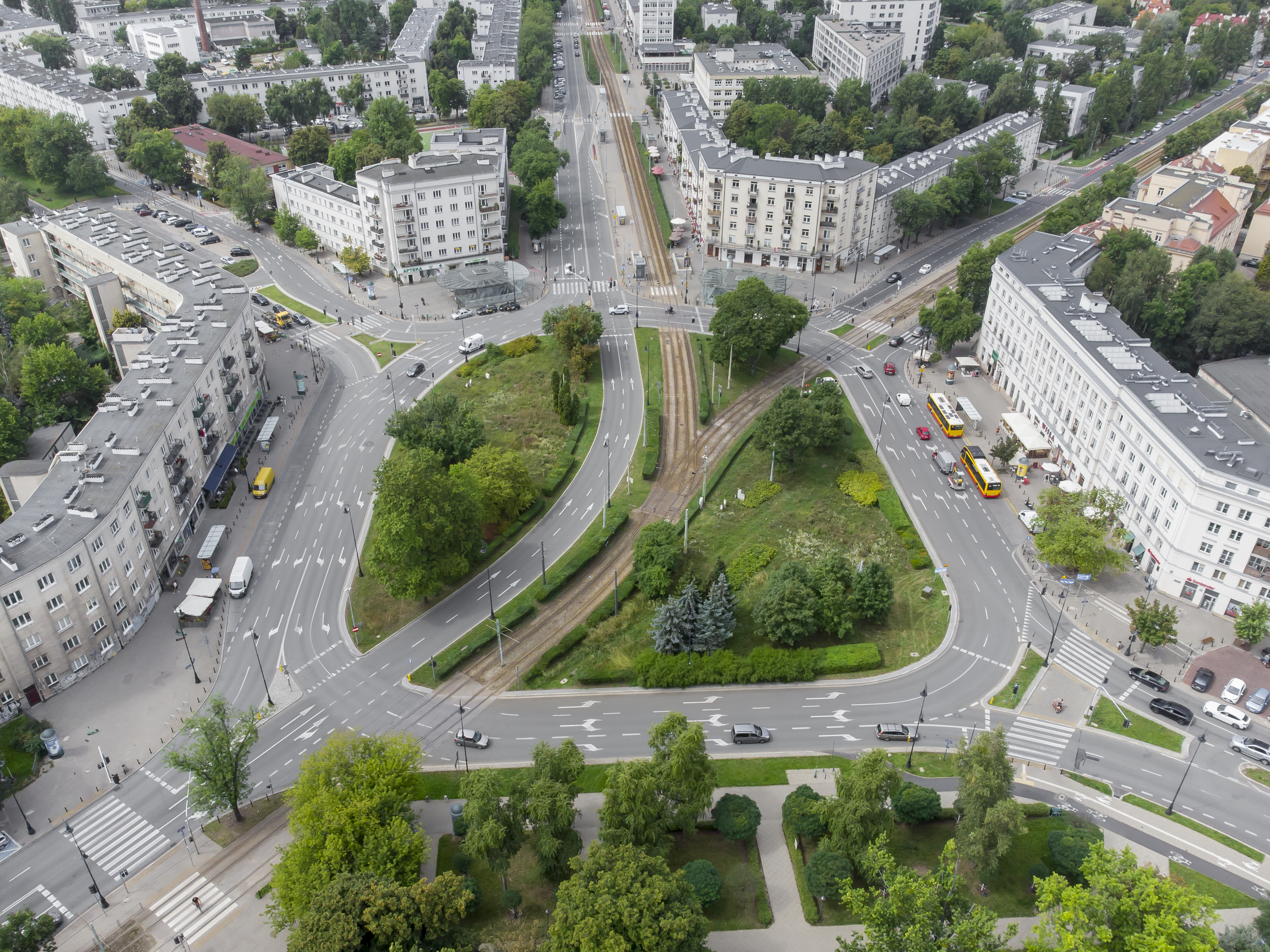
- Wilson Square in 2022

- Location within Warsaw
- Former names: Stefan Żeromski Square (c. 1923–1926); Danzig Square (1940–1944); Paris Commune Square (1951–1990)
- Namesake: Thomas Woodrow Wilson
- Location: Żoliborz, Warsaw, Poland
- Coordinates: 52°16′08″N 20°59′11″E
- North: Mickiewicza Street
- East: Krasińskiego Street
- South: Mickiewicza Street
- West: Krasińskiego Street; Słowackiego Street

Construction
- Completion: c. 1923

Other
- Designer: Józef Jankowski; Antoni Jawornicki; Tadeusz Tołwiński

Thomas Woodrow Wilson Square (Polish: Plac Thomasa Woodrowa Wilsona), also simply known as Wilson Square (Plac Wilsona), is an urban square and a roundabout in Warsaw, Poland, within the district of Żoliborz. It forms a roundabout at the intersection of Mickiewicza, Krasińskiego, and Słowackiego Streets. The square was constructed around 1923.

== History ==
Between 1849 and 1851, to the southeast from future square, Sokolnicki Fort (originally known as the Sergei Fort), which was part of Warsaw Citadel, was constructed. It was expanded between 1864 and 1874, and was mainly used as a police building and prison.

The square was designed by Józef Jankowski, Antoni Jawornicki, and Tadeusz Tołwiński, and constructed around 1923. That year, it was named Stefan Żeromski Square (Polish: Plac Stefana Żeromskiego) for the 19th- and 20th-century novelist and dramatist.

Between 1926 and 1928, in the northeast corner of the square, four tenements of the Warsaw Housing Association, designed by Bruno Zborowski, were constructed. Between 1928 and 1932, the building of the Fenix Housing Association, designed by Roman Feliński, was also constructed there.

On 27 September 1926, it was renamed to Thomas Woodrow Wilson Square. The square is named after Thomas Woodrow Wilson, the 28th president of the United States (in office between 1913 and 1921). In his 1918 Fourteen Points peace proposal, Wilson called for the establishment of an independent Poland. The full name of the square is Thomas Woodrow Wilson Square (Polish: Plac Thomasa Woodrowa Wilsona), although it is usually known simply as Wilson Square (Polish: Plac Wilsona). The idea for the name originated on 21 February 1924, when, shortly after Wilson's death on 3 February 1924, the city council had decided to name a street, a city square, or an institution, after him.

The Stefan Żeromski Park, to the square's southeast, was developed between 1925 and 1932.

In May 1940, during the Second World War, Nazi Germany occupied the city, during which the square was renamed to Danzig Square (German: Danziger Platz; Polish: Plac Gdański), after the city of Gdańsk (German: Danzig). However, the local population refused to use said name.

On 3 May 1943, at 6 p.m., while the city was under German occupation during the Second World War, the patriotic audition made by Directorate of Civil Resistance was played from the loudspeaker at the square. It ended with the recording of the anthem of Poland. The audition was heard by the people gathered at the square, including a group of German soldiers, and the news of the incident quickly spread across the city. A portion of the buildings around the square were destroyed in 1944, including the entirety of the Warsaw Housing Association complex. It was renamed back to Thomas Woodrow Wilson Square after the end of the war.

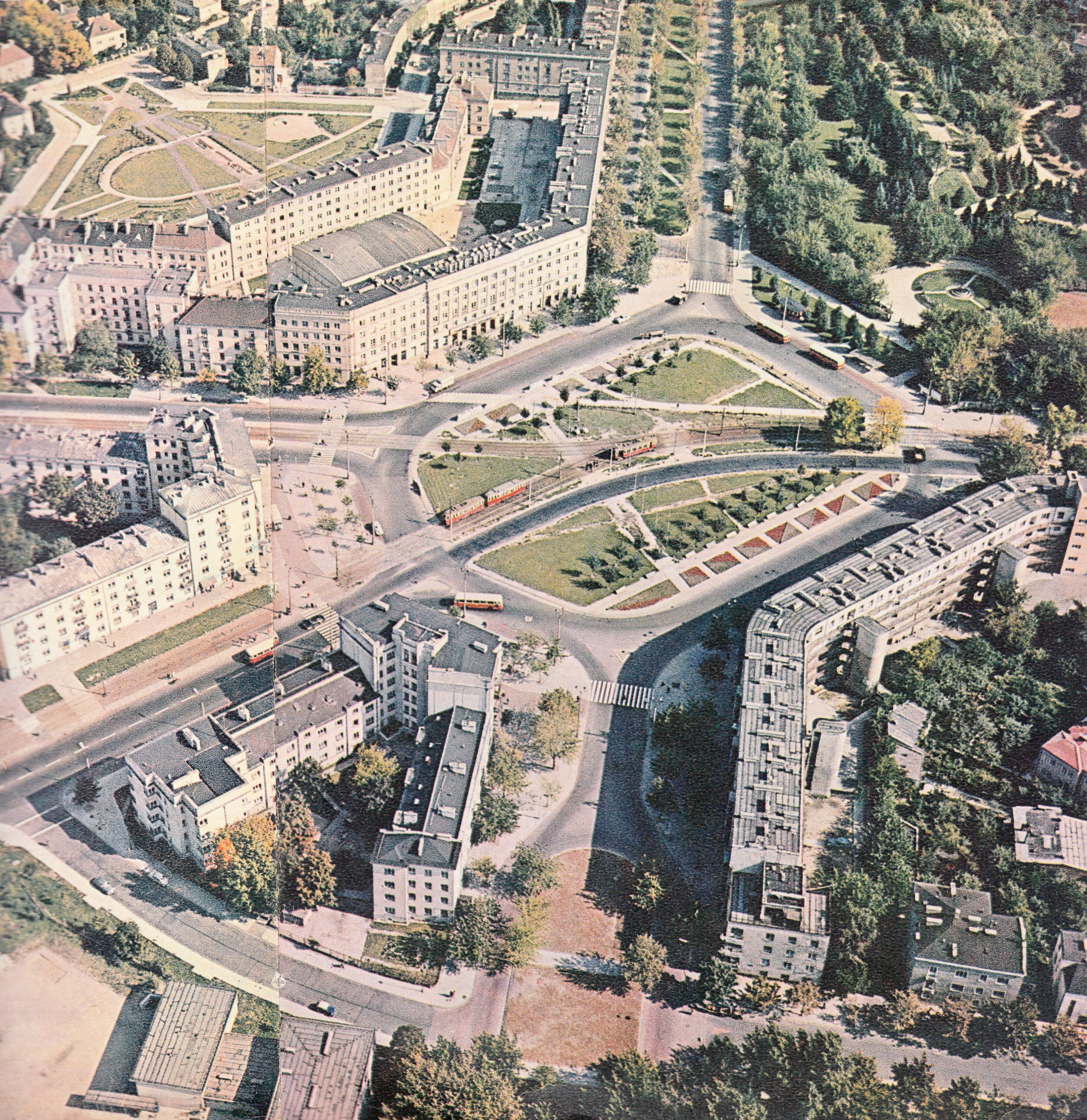
Wilson Square in 1964

In March 1951, in commemoration of the 80th anniversary of the Paris Commune seizing power in Paris on 18 March 1871, the square was renamed to Paris Commune Square (Polish: Plac Komuny Paryskiej). The square was remodeled around 1955, with changes to the shape of streets and tram tracks, and the addition of lawns. In 1990, it was again renamed to T. W. Wilson Square (Polish: plac. im. T.W. Wilsona). On 8 April 2005, the Plac Wilsona (Wilson Square) station of the M1 line of the Warsaw Metro underground rapid transit system was opened there. In August 2012, its name was extended to Thomas Woodrow Wilson Square (Polish: Plac Thomasa Woodrowa Wilsona).

== Characteristics ==
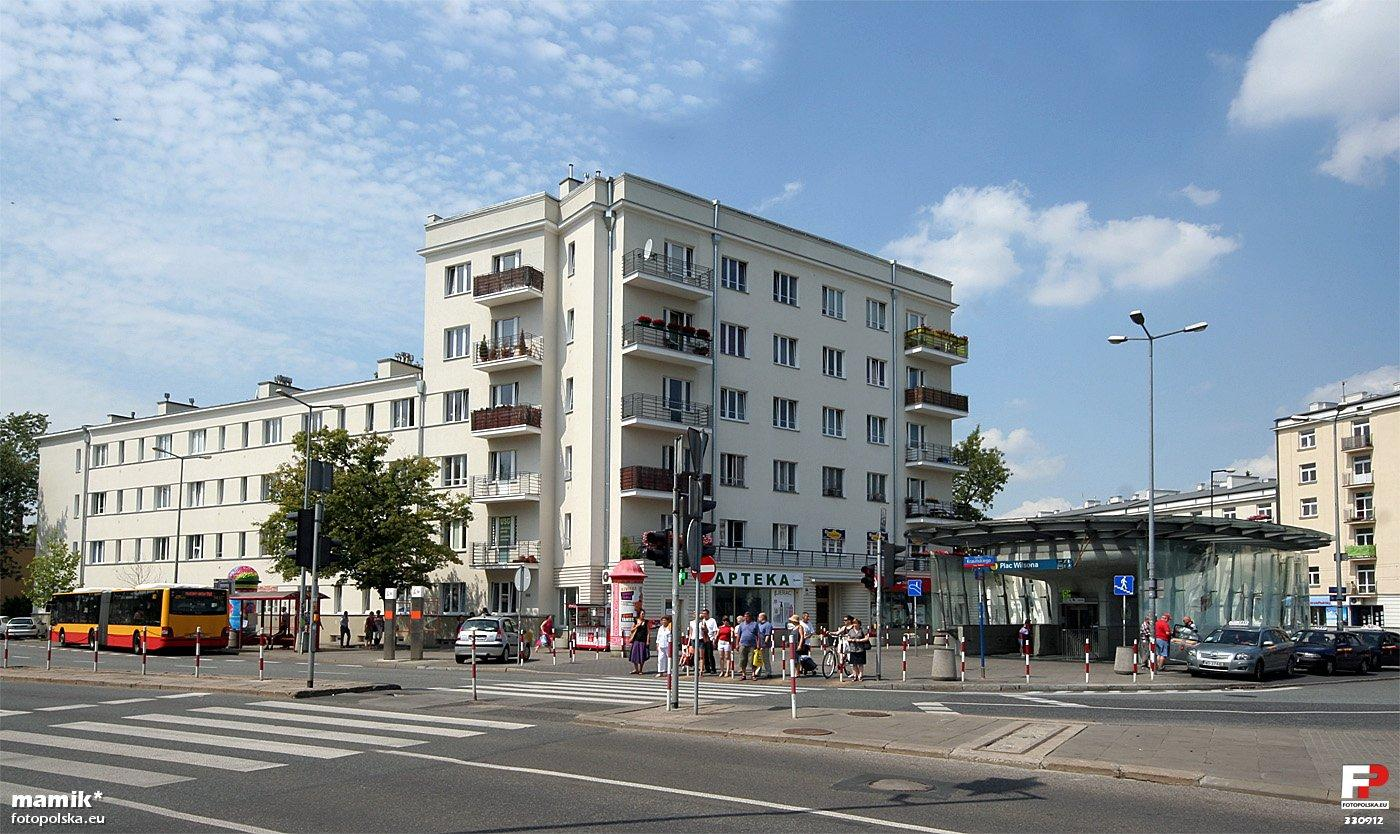
One of the apartment buildings around Wilson Square in 2012

Wilson Square is located in the district of Żoliborz, within the neighbourhood of Old Żoliborz. It is surrounded by roads, forming a roundabout at the intersection of Mickiewicza, Krasińskiego, and Słowackiego Streets. It is also crossed by tram tracks, and a road directly connecting Mickiewicza and Słowackiego Streets.

The square is covered with a lawn and greenery. Around it are tenements. At its southeast corner is the main entrance to the Stefan Żeromski Park, which also includes the 19th-century Sokolnicki Fort.

It is also the location of the Plac Wilsona (Wilson Square) station of the M1 line of the Warsaw Metro underground rapid transit system.
