= Metamorphosis (Miró) =

Series of collage drawings by Joan Miró

Metamorphosis or Metamorphose
- Artist: Joan Miró
- Year: 1936
- Type: Collage
- Dimensions: 64 cm × 46.8 cm (25 in × 18.4 in)

Metamorphosis is a series of collage-drawings by Joan Miró, made between 1935 and 1936. This is a series of works made as an interlude while Miró was painting the series Paintings on Masonite.

== Description ==
As the series made on Masonite, in these works the artist expresses his concern about the political situation in the 1930s, the conservative black biennium in Spain, when the conservative ministers and the central government actions led to a series of widespread protests over land and the Catalan republic cause was renewed by the army. Commentators have seen these collage pictures as adding extra depth to Miró's more colourful production on copper and masonite at this time.

== 2011 Exhibition ==
The exhibition L'escala de l'evasió that opened in October 2011 was supported by access to Wikipedia using QRpedia codes that allowed access to visitors in Catalan, English, and several other languages.

== Series ==
Reg.number (Dupin)	Artwork	Date	Format	Size (cm)	Museum	City	Ref.
593	Metamorphose	1936	Pencil and collage on paper decal	46 × 62	Private collection	ND	
594	Metamorphose	23 March - 4 April 1936	Pencil and collage on paper decal	64 × 48	The Pierre and Maria Gaetana-Matisse Foundation	New York	
595	Metamorphose	1936	Pencil and decal on paper	64 × 43.5	MoMA	New York	
596	Metamorphose	1936	Pencil and collage on paper decal	62 × 46	Private collection.	ND	
597	Metamorphose	23 March - 4 April 1936	Pencil, India ink, and paper collage on paper	62 × 46	Private collection.	ND	
598	Metamorphose	1936	Pencil, India ink, decal and watercolor on paper	62 × 46	Private collection.	ND	
599	Metamorphose	23 March - 4 April 1936	Pencil, India ink, decal and watercolor on paper	62 × 46	Private collection.	ND	
600	Metamorphose	1936	Pencil, India ink, decal and watercolor on paper	62 × 46	Private collection.	ND	
601	Metamorphose	23 March - 4 April 1936	Pencil, India ink, decal, newspaper collage and watercolor on paper	64 × 48	Private collection.	ND	
602	Metamorphose	23 March - 4 April 1936	Gouache, Indian ink, on paper decal	62 × 46	R. and H.Batliner Foundation		
603	Metamorphose	23 March - 4 April 1936	Pencil, India ink, decal and watercolor on paper	46 × 62	Private collection.	ND	
604	Metamorphose	23 March - 4 April 1936	Pencil, India ink, decal and collage on paper	48 × 64	The Pierre and Maria-Gaetana Matisse Foundation	New York	
605	Metamorphose	23 March - 4 April 1936	Pencil, India ink, decal and collage on paper	46 × 62	Richard and Mary L.Gray Collection.	Chicago	
606	Metamorphose	23 March - 4 April 1936	Pencil, India ink, and gouache on paper decal	46 × 62	Private collection.	ND	
607	Metamorphose	23 March - 4 April 1936	Pencil, India ink, and gouache on paper decal	62 × 46	Private collection.	ND	
608	Metamorphose	23 March - 4 April 1936	Pencil, watercolor on paper decal and stencils	62 × 46	Private collection.	ND	
609	Metamorphose	23 March - 4 April 1936	Pencil and collage on paper decal	62 × 46	Private collection.	ND	
610	Metamorphose	23 March - 4 April 1936	Pencil, India ink, turpentine, and watercolor on paper decal	46 × 62	Private collection.	ND	
611	Metamorphose	23 March - 4 April 1936	Pencil, watercolor on paper decal and stencils	64 × 48	The Pierre and Maria-Gaetana Matisse Foundation	New York	
612	Metamorphose	23 March - 4 April 1936	Pencil, India ink, turpentine, and watercolor on paper decal and stencils	47 × 59	Private collection.	ND	
613	Metamorphose	23 March - 4 April 1936	Pencil, ink, watercolor, transfers, and collage on paper template	48 × 64	Private collection.	ND	
614	Metamorphose	23 March - 4 April 1936	Pencil, ink, watercolor, transfers, and collage on paper template	46 × 62	Private collection.	ND	
615	Metamorphose	23 March - 4 April 1936	Pencil, ink, watercolor, transfers, and collage on paper template	48 × 64	The Pierre and Maria-Gaetana Matisse Foundation	New York	
