= The Loup River, Alpes Maritimes =

Painting by Winston Churchill

- Artist: Winston Churchill
- Year: 1936
- Type: Oil on canvas, landscape painting
- Dimensions: 51.1 cm × 61 cm (20.1 in × 24 in)
- Location: Tate Britain, London

The Loup River, Alpes Maritimes is a 1936 oil painting by the British artist and politician Winston Churchill. It shows a stretch of the Loup in south-eastern France. Churchill was taught by a variety of leading artists including John Lavery and Walter Sickert and his work drew on the tradition of British Impressionism.

Encouraged by the President of the Royal Academy Alfred Munnings, Churchill began exhibiting works there in the 1940s. This painting was displayed at the Royal Academy Exhibition of 1947 at Burlington House in London when he exhibited under the pseudonym David Winter. The following year he began exhibiting under his name, and used this image for the cover of his book Painting as a Pastime. In 1955 he presented the work to the Tate Gallery at its request and it enjoyed popular enthusiasm once it went on display. During the 1990s it was loaned to 10 Downing Street.

== See also ==
- Winston Churchill as a painter

== Bibliography ==
- Cannadine, David. Churchill: The Statesman as Artist. Bloomsbury Publishing, 2018.
- Davis, Lucy (ed.) Winston Churchill: The Painter. Bloomsbury Publishing, 2006.
