= The Arrival of the Jarrow Marchers in London =

Painting by Thomas Cantrell Dugdale

- Artist: Thomas Cantrell Dugdale
- Year: 1936
- Type: Oil on canvas, genre painting
- Dimensions: 76.5 cm × 64 cm (30.1 in × 25 in)
- Location: Museum of the Home, London

The Arrival of the Jarrow Marchers in London is a 1936 oil painting by the British artist Thomas Cantrell Dugdale. It depicts the arrival of the Jarrow March in London, who had marched to the capital to present a petition at the severe impact of poverty and unemployment. As they pass through Piccadilly, from the interior of a well-furnished room a young woman in evening dress looks out at them while her male companion sits smoking. Her gaze is curious but nonchalant as she stares down at the crowd of marchers.

The artist was best known as a portraitist who was elected a member of the Royal Academy of Arts in 1943. The painting is now in the collection of the Museum of the Home in London which acquired it in 1974.

== Bibliography ==
- Hillier, Bevis. The Style of the Century: 1900–1980. Bloomsbury Academic, 1998.
- Vernon, James. Hunger: A Modern History. Harvard University Press, 2009.
- Wallace, Diana. The Woman's Historical Novel: British Women Writers, 1900–2000. Palgrave Macmillan, 2004.
