= Victor Noble Rainbird =

English painter (1887–1936)

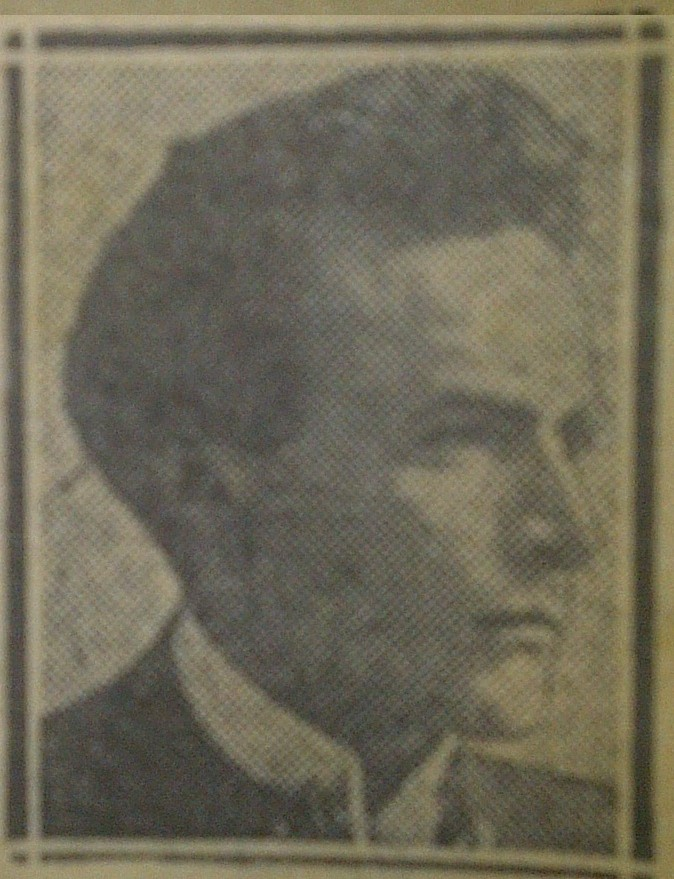
Victor Noble Rainbird as pictured in the Shields Daily News, circa 1910

Victor Noble Rainbird (12 December 1887 – 8 March 1936) was a painter, stained glass artist and illustrator.

== Early life and education ==
Rainbird was born on 12 December 1887 in North Shields, United Kingdom, son of James William Rainbird (b. Ireland 1856, m. 1884) and Rosabella Foubister (b. 1859). Victor had an elder brother William Stewart Rainbird, born in early 1886 in North Shields.

Rainbird attended King's College (now Newcastle University), Newcastle upon Tyne, where he distinguished himself and won several prizes. His pictures were included in a government exhibition which toured Australia, New Zealand and Canada. He later attended the Royal Academy Schools where he twice won Silver Medals as well as the Landseer Scholarship.

== Career ==
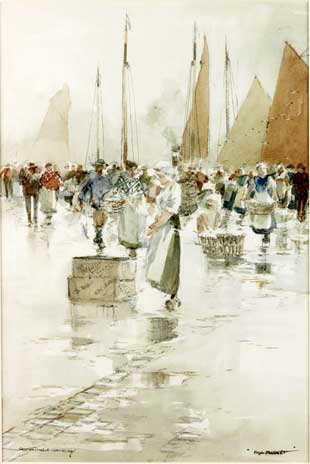
Watercolour painting of a fish market by Rainbird

On 15 July 1916, Rainbird married Elizabeth Kirkley at York Registry Office, whilst he was a Lance Corporal (38539) in the 6th Northumberland Fusiliers. After the war he left as Corporal in the Durham Light Infantry (46585) and practised as a professional artist in North Shields and exhibited works at the Artists of the Northern Counties exhibitions at the Laing Art Gallery in Newcastle upon Tyne, at the Walker Art Gallery in Liverpool and also at the Royal Academy.

Rainbird's work often depicts sights of North Shields (captioned 'In Old Shields' or 'Old Ropery Stairs') and the seafront and sea around North Shields and other Tyne harbours. He made several trips to France, Belgium and the Netherlands, and a large proportion of his work is of continental subjects, impressions of Rouen, Amiens, Dieppe or Dutch fisherfolk. Rarer subjects include stained glass window images, portraits and still life (flowers).

It appears that Rainbird used his paintings to pay his way through life and often seemed to have done paintings to 'pay for his supper'. His work often appears at auctions worldwide, but most commonly at the Newcastle upon Tyne auction house Anderson and Garland, where an average watercolour work of 10 inches × 14 inches would make around GBP 85.00 (2015) in their quarterly auctions of fine art.

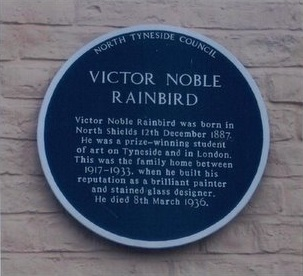
Plaque on the wall of 71 West Percy Street

It was thought that the only surviving example of stained glass work by the artist can be found in Papa Stour Kirk, on the island of Papa Stour in Shetland. It was commissioned to commemorate six Papa men who were lost in World War I and was fitted in 1921. The window depicts Jesus calming a storm. However, in 2014 a fan of Rainbird found two of his missing stained glass windows in Trinity Methodist Church in Allendale, Northumberland. They depicts an image of Jesus and a soldier. After being lost for over 94 years, Rainbird's stained glass windows had been found again.

Between 1917 and 1933, Rainbird lived at 71 West Percy Street, North Shields. The house has a commemorative blue plaque marking his residence.

Rainbird died on 8 March 1936 in Sunderland.
