= Abu Taher (artist) =

Bangladeshi artist (1936–2020)

- আবু তাহের
- Born: 1936
- Died: 18 December 2020 (aged 83–84); Dhaka, Bangladesh
- Education: University of Dhaka
- Occupation: Artist

Abu Taher (1936 – 18 December 2020) was a Bangladeshi artist. He was awarded Ekushey Padak by the government of Bangladesh in 1994.

== Early life and career ==
Taher earned his bachelor's from the Faculty of Fine Arts, University of Dhaka in 1963.

Taher, as an expressionist painter, worked on large canvases. His work was dominated by strong whirling, thick colors, broken lines and various vague shapes and forms. A solo painting exhibition of him was held at Gallery Chitrak in Dhanmondi in July 2018.
