= Thomas Cantrell Dugdale =

British painter (1880–1952)

- Born: 2 June 1880; Blackburn, Lancashire, England
- Died: 13 November 1952 (aged 72); London, England
- Education: Manchester School of Art; Royal College of Art; City and Guilds of London Art School; Academie Julian; Académie Colarossi
- Known for: Portrait painting
- Spouse: Amy Katherine Browning (m. 1916)

Thomas Cantrell Dugdale RA RP ROI (2 June 1880 – 13 November 1952) was a British artist. He was a member of the Royal Academy, was a renowned portrait painter and served as a war artist in both World War One and World War Two.

== Biography ==
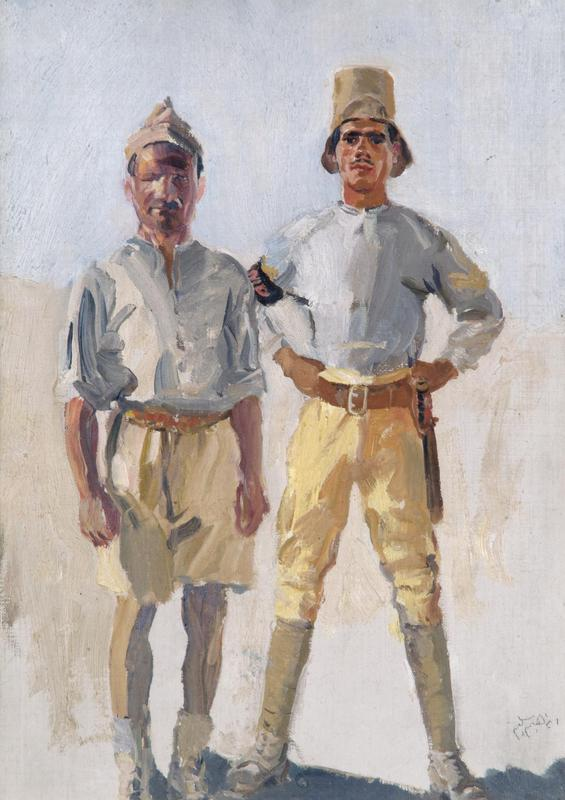
Military Policemen in Palestine, (c.1918) (Art.IWM ART 6224)

Dugdale was born in Blackburn in Lancashire and attended Manchester Grammar School. He initially studied art at the Manchester School of Art before continuing his studies at the Royal College of Art. He also studied at the City and Guilds of London Art School and in Paris at the Academie Julian and the Académie Colarossi. Dugdale first exhibited at the Royal Academy in 1901 and continued to do so until 1952. In 1910 he enlisted in the British Army and during World War One, Dugdale served as a staff sergeant in the Middlesex Yeomanry in Egypt, Palestine and Gallipoli. While on active service Dugdale continued to paint and four of these pieces were acquired by the British War Memorials Committee. A selection of Dugdale's paintings from Palestine and Egypt were shown at the Leicester Galleries in London in April 1919. The Witt Library has a number of political cartoons by Dugdale, possibly dating from around 1914 but it is unclear if, or where, they were intended for publication.

During World War Two, Dugdale lived in Suffolk where he organised a Home Guard unit. Throughout the conflict, from July 1940 to July 1945, Dugdale received portrait commissions from the War Artists' Advisory Committee to depict several merchant seaman and RAF pilots.

In addition to his oil paintings, Dugdale designed book covers and was also a textile designer. Early in his career he designed woodcut decorations for some books. For twenty years, from 1919, Dugdale was an advisor to the textile company Tootal Broadhurst Lee. He was married to a fellow artist, Amy Katherine Browning from 1916.

His work was also part of the art competitions at the 1932 Summer Olympics and the 1948 Summer Olympics.

== Memberships ==
- 1910: Member, Royal Institute of Oil Painters
- 1925: Member, Royal Society of Portrait Painters
- 1936: Elected associate of the Royal Academy,
- 1943: Elected full member of the Royal Academy.

== Gallery ==
Underground, 1932

The Arrival of the Jarrow Marchers in London, 1936

Portrait of Jessie Matthews, 1937

Professional and academic associations
Preceded by James Patchell Chettle	President of the Manchester Academy of Fine Arts; 1946–49	Succeeded by Charles Oppenheimer
