= Paintings on Masonite =

Series of paintings by Joan Miró

- Artist: Joan Miró
- Year: 1936
- Type: Oil, tar, sand and casein on masonite
- Dimensions: 78 cm × 108 cm (32 1/4 in × 40 3/4 in)

Paintings on Masonite is a series of 27 abstract paintings made by Joan Miró using the type of proprietary hardboard known as masonite, just after the Spanish Civil War started on 18 July 1936. These works break with his earlier phase which was known as his wild paintings period. This was a label established to describe the work done during the two years preceding the Civil War, between 1934 and 1936.

== Description and reviews ==
Rosa Maria Malet Ph.D, President of the Fundació Joan Miró in Barcelona (1980-2017), compares masonites with the wild paintings immediately preceding, painted on copper and other materials:

On July 18, the civil war is declared. Given this fact, Miró painted witnesses of the facts, but a kind of direct and violent exorcisms, the 27 masonites. What is wild in this series are not representations, but the very act of painting. The monsters are replaced by the painter's direct attack on the canvas that serves as a stimulus. The matter of funds, masonite, it will never be completely hidden. Miró created a mix with casein, black Ripoli, sand, bitumen ... [...] The masonites have the force of a shout.

— Rosa Maria Malet

The Museum of Modern Art in New York also emphasizes the violence of the technique:

[...] it has long been suggested that these works represent Miró’s response to the emotional and physical turmoil in his homeland, although the artist insisted that they were produced "despite the current events." In these works, narrative is replaced by a heightened emphasis on texture and materials, including oil and enamel paints, casein, tar, sand, and pebbles. Miró sometimes violently attacked his Masonite panels, gouging craters into their fibrous matrix, creating irreversible marks and conveying a sense of raw immediacy.

— MoMA Press

The works were painted in Mont-roig del Camp and Barcelona. Shortly after he finished these paintings, the artist left the country and went back to Paris, in the fall of 1936, where he would stay for four years.

== The series ==
Register	Artwork	Size (cm)	Museum	City	Ref.
	Painting I	78 × 108 cm	Private collection	ND	
	Painting II	78 × 108 cm	Private collection	ND	
	Painting III	78 × 108 cm	Private collection	ND	
	Painting IV	78 × 108 cm	Private collection	ND	
	Painting V	78 × 108 cm	Private collection	ND	
	Painting VI	78 × 108 cm	Private collection	ND	
	Painting VII	78 × 108 cm	Private collection	ND	
	Painting VIII	78 × 108 cm	Private collection	ND	
	Painting IX	78 × 108 cm	Nagasaki Prefectural Art Museum	Nagasaki	
	Painting X	78 × 108 cm	Private collection	ND	
	Painting XI	78 × 108 cm	Private collection	ND	
	Painting XII	78 × 108 cm	Private collection	ND	
	Painting XIII	78 × 108 cm	Private collection	ND	
	Painting XIV	108 × 78 cm	Fundació Joan Miró	Barcelona	
	Painting XV	78 × 108 cm	Israel Museum	Jerusalem	
	Painting XVI	78 × 108 cm	Private collection	ND	
	Painting XVII	108 × 78 cm	Private collection	ND	
	Painting XVIII	78 × 108 cm	Private collection	ND	
	Painting XIX	78 × 108 cm	Private collection	ND	
	Painting XX	78 × 108 cm	Private collection	ND	
	Painting XXI	78 × 108 cm	Fundació Joan Miró	Barcelona	
	Painting XXII	78 × 108 cm	Private collection	ND	
	Painting XXIII	78 × 108 cm	Art Institute of Chicago	Chicago	
	Painting XXIV	108 × 78 cm	Private collection	ND	
	Painting XXV	78 × 108 cm	Private collection	ND	
	Painting XXVI	78 × 108 cm	Private collection	London	
	Painting XXVII	78 × 108 cm	Private collection	ND	

== See also ==
- The Love Embrace of the Universe, the Earth (Mexico), Myself, Diego, and Señor Xolotl, a painting on masonite by Frida Kahlo.
