= Henryk Kuna =

Polish sculptor

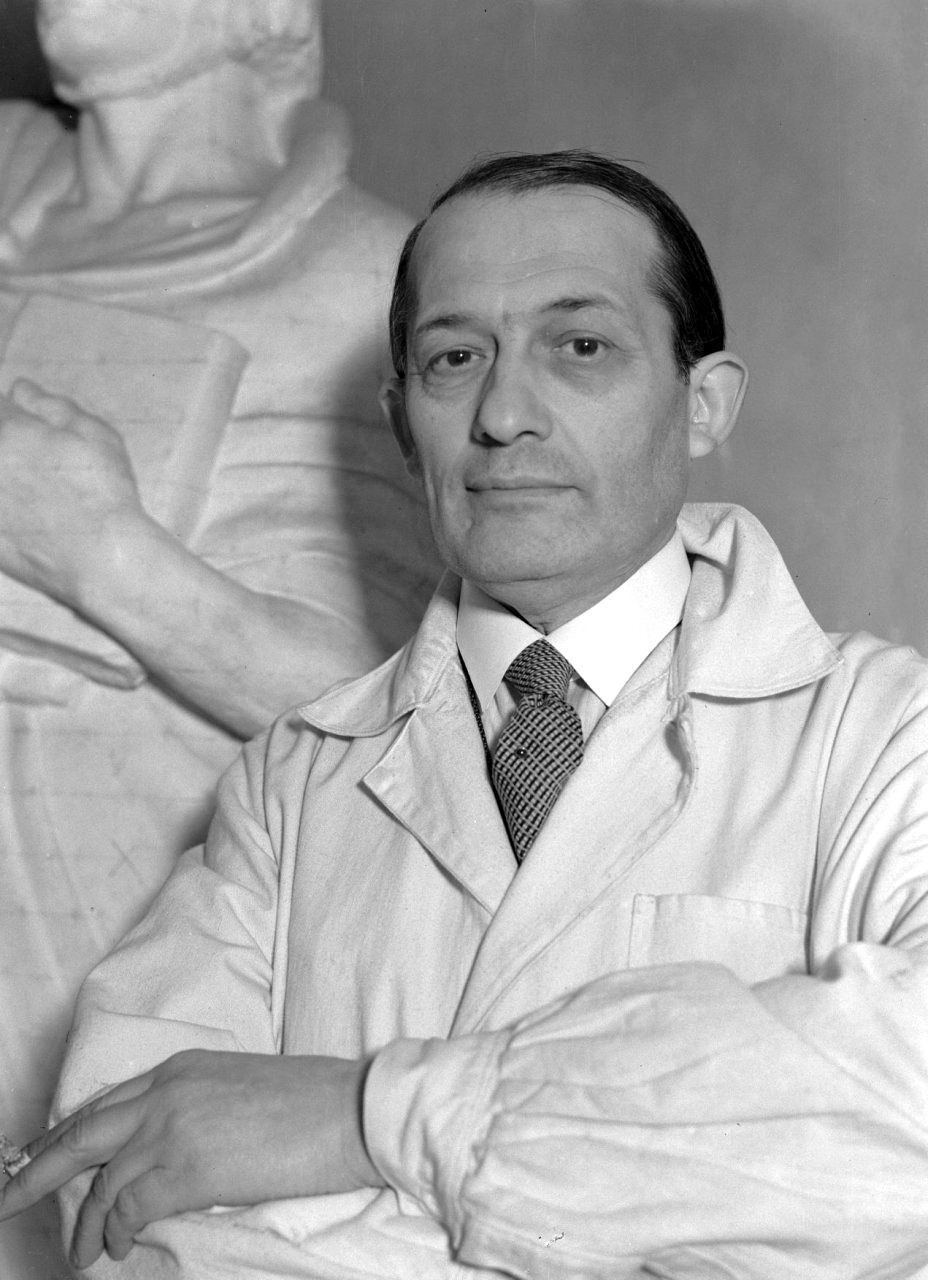
Henryk Kuna in 1934

Henryk Kuna (c.1885 – 17 December 1945) was a Polish sculptor, active in the early twentieth century. His long career produced many famous works of arts including several renowned public monuments in his native country of Poland.

== Life ==
Henryk Kuna was born to a Jewish family in Warsaw in 1885 or possibly earlier (various sources give his year of birth as far back as 1879). Kuna studied art at the Academy of Fine Arts in Kraków where he met fellow artists who would become lifelong friends. Many of them became deeply involved in Kuna's informal school of art known as Rytm (Rhythm). The group focused on the development of a Polish national style melding modernity with classicism.

Kuna was a well-established artist in his time. He was appointed, along with the artists Teodor Axentowicz, Julian Fałat and others, to represent Poland at the XII Venice Biennale in 1920. Kuna's fame flourished further with a well-received solo exhibition in London two years later.

Kuna was a university lecturer in the northern city of Toruń. He died in Toruń in 1945. He was interred in Warsaw's historic Powązki Cemetery.

== Works ==
Kuna was chosen for a project to sculpt a statue of Polish national hero Adam Mickiewicz for the city of Vilnius in the early 1930s. His work progressed on a number of bas reliefs, evocative of the romantic themes of Mickiewicz's writing, which were to surround the statue. When the Nazis invaded in 1939, the monument site was largely destroyed by a bomb, and under their occupation many of the bas reliefs were hauled off to a cemetery as paving stones.

A new sculpture by Gediminas Jokūbonis was unveiled in 1984 with Kuna's surviving bas reliefs emplaced around it. In the turbulent 1980s and 1990s, the site was a popular meeting place for political dissidents.

Kuna's most iconic work, the lifesize female nude Rytm (Rhythm, 1925), seemingly sways waterside in the Praga Południe district of Warsaw. Another female figure, Alina, stands amid a fountain at Stefan Żeromski Park in the Żoliborz district.

Among Kuna's other works are Jutrzenka (Daybreak, 1919); Rozowy marmur (Pink Marble, 1930); and Portraits of K.R Witkowski (1930).

In 1930, Kuna was awarded the Officer's Cross of the Order of Polonia Restituta and, in 1935, the Golden Laurel of the Polish Academy of Literature.

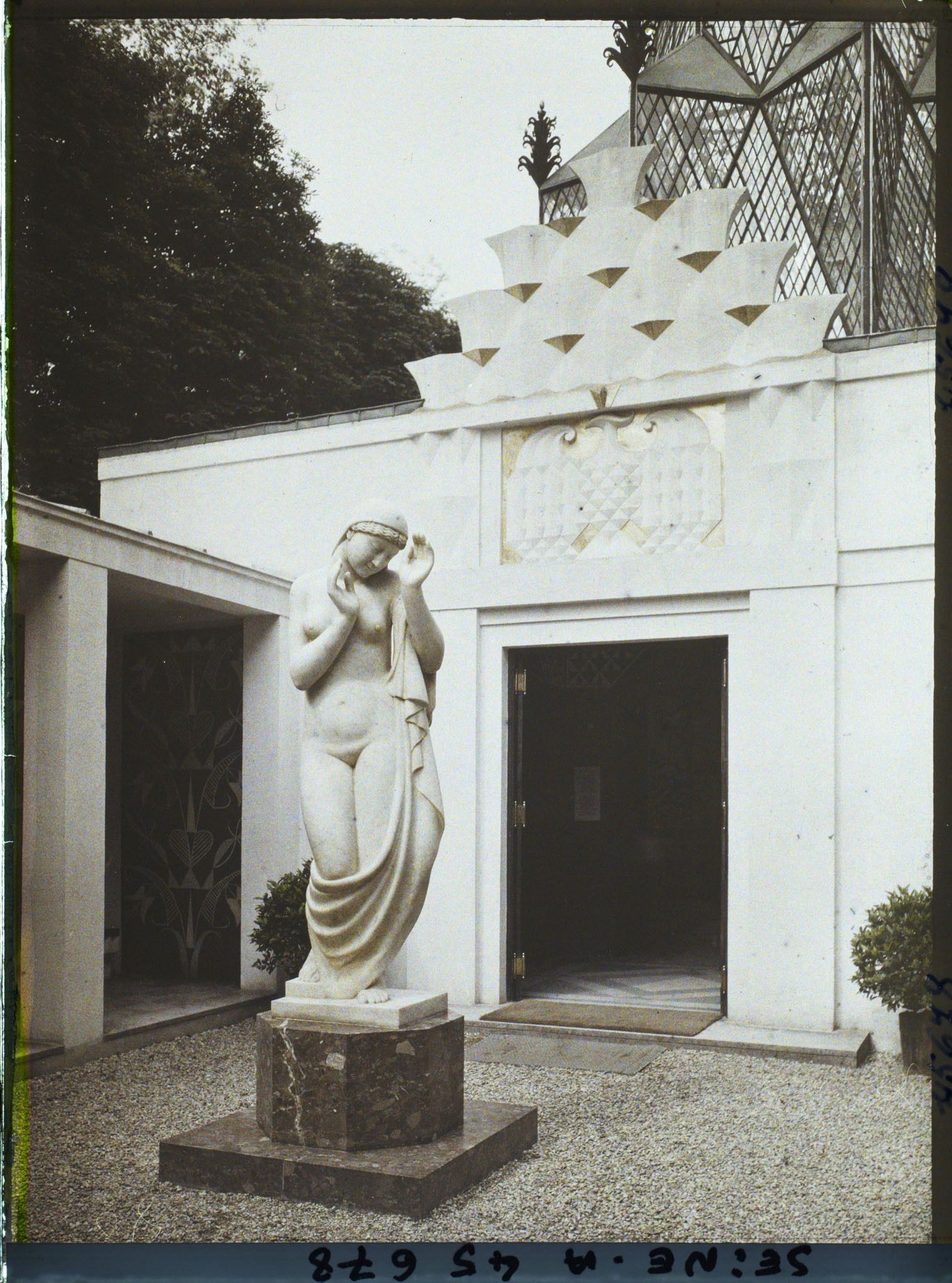
Rytm (Paris, 1925)

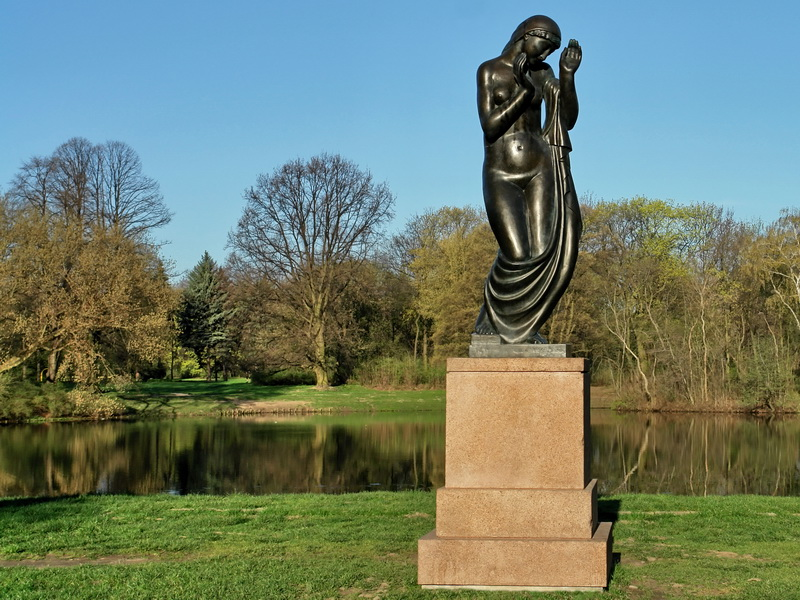
Rytm (Warsaw, 1925)

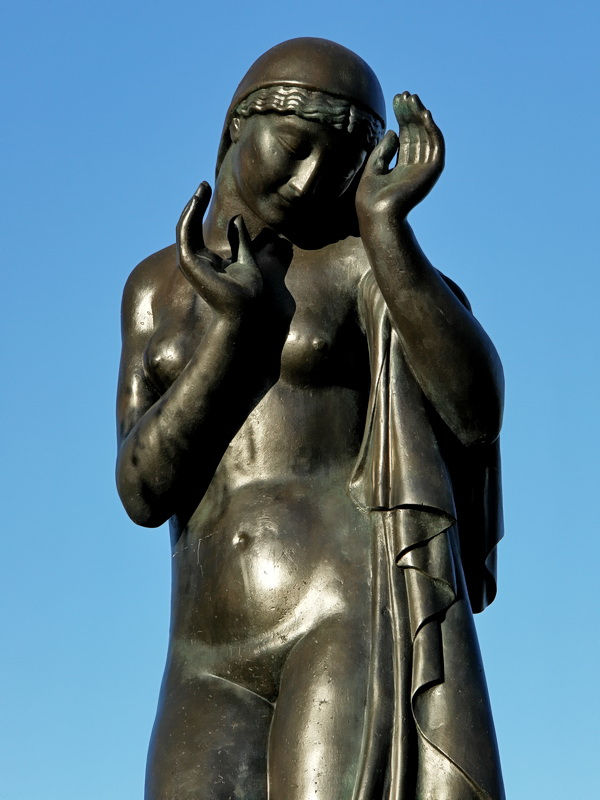
Rytm (detail), Warsaw
