= Żoliborz =

- Warsaw district
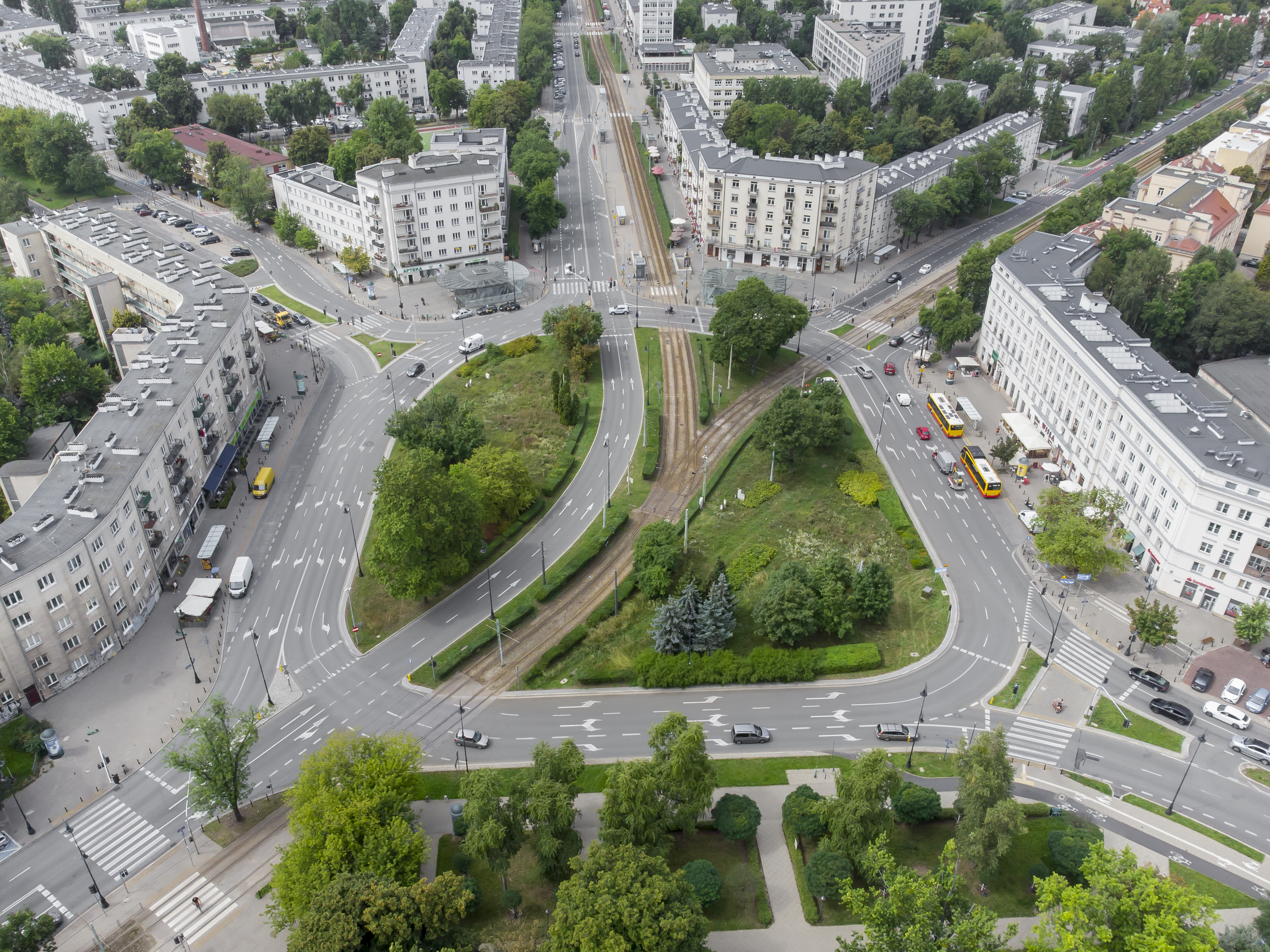
- Panorama of Żoliborz with Wilson Square

- Location of Żoliborz within Warsaw
- Coordinates: 52°15′59″N 20°58′38″E
- Country: Poland
- Voivodeship: Masovian
- City and county: Warsaw
- Notable landmarks: List: St. Stanislaus Kostka Church; Warsaw Citadel

Government
  - Mayor: Renata Kozłowska
- Area: 8.47 km^{2} (3.27 sq mi)
- Population (2023): 58,809
  - Density: 6,940/km^{2} (18,000/sq mi)
- Time zone: UTC+1 (CET)
  - Summer (DST): UTC+2 (CEST)
- Area code: +48 22
- Website: zoliborz.um.warszawa.pl

Żoliborz (Polish pronunciation: [ʐɔˈlibɔʂ]) is one of the northern districts of the city of Warsaw. It is located directly to the north of the City Centre, on the left bank of the Vistula river. It has approximately 50,000 inhabitants and is one of the smallest boroughs of Warsaw. Despite its small size, the district has many green areas and mostly consists of low-rise architecture. Historically an upscale neighborhood and home to Warsaw's intelligentsia prior to World War II, Żoliborz is the second most expensive residential district in Warsaw after Śródmieście.

== History ==
In the 18th century the area belonged to the Piarists of a monastery in the nearby city of Warsaw. The monks started to parcel the grounds and allowed for the creation of various settlements on their fields, which were parceled between several villages. One of them was named Joli Bord (Beautiful Embankment in French, which was later transcribed to Polish language as Żoliborz). After 1831, the area was confiscated by Russian authorities, who erected the Warsaw Citadel there. The area was mostly unpopulated and even after the ban on construction of brick-made houses was lifted, it retained much of its rural character.

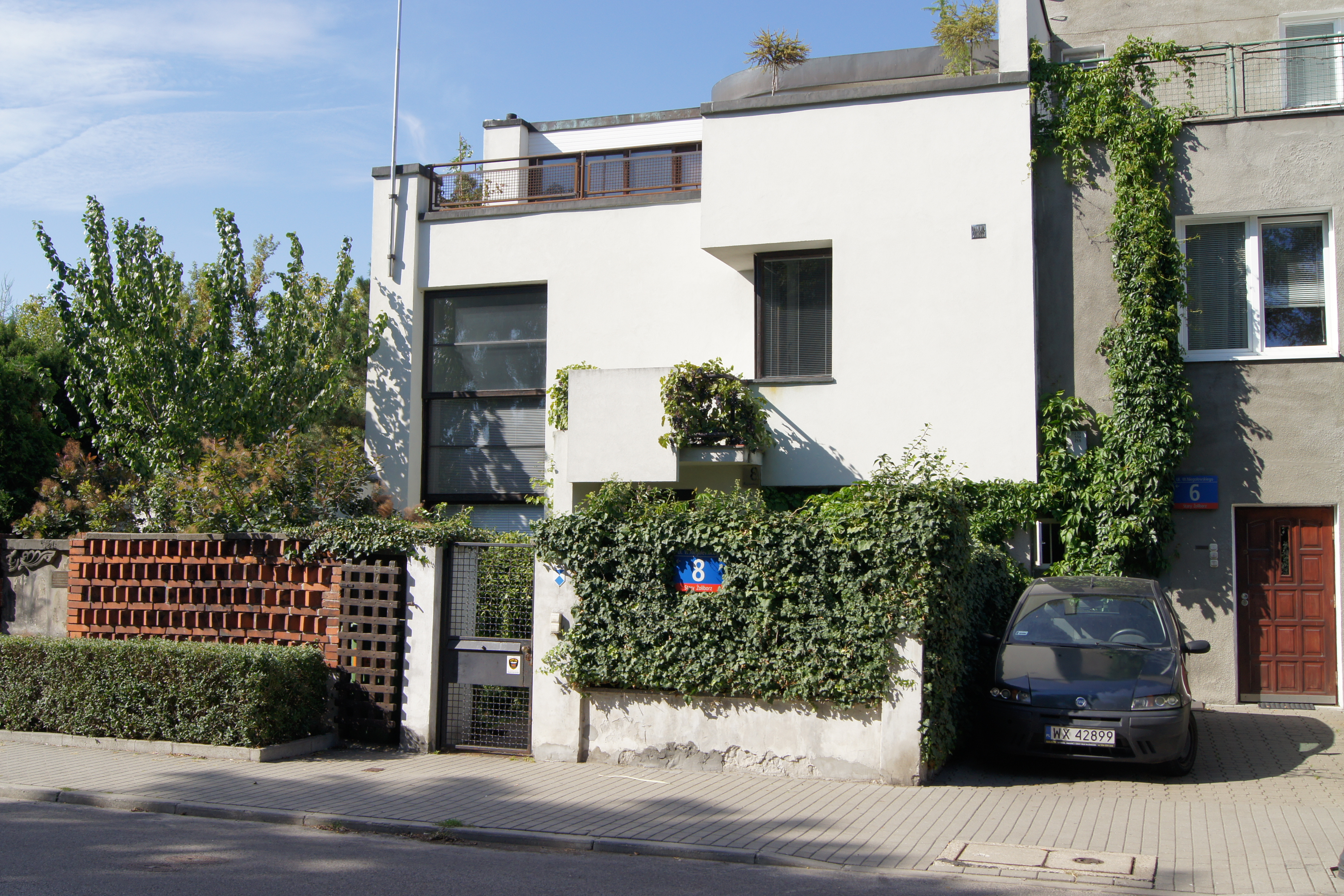
House designed by Barbara Brukalska, Niegolewskiego 8

After Poland regained its independence in 1918, the city of Warsaw started to grow rapidly and new areas were needed. In the 1920s, the area of Żoliborz was converted into a borough of Warsaw and the construction of new houses started. Until the late 1930s part of today's Żoliborz was built-up with houses notable for their modernist architecture. Open areas, parks and squares built there are regarded as fine examples of good urbanist architecture. Also, a so-called Żoliborz Oficerski (Officers' Żoliborz) was built up with villas for the officers of the Polish Army and other notable people of the epoch. Several star-shaped squares were built along the main axis of the borough, with the Plac Wilsona as the borough's centre and main transport hub.

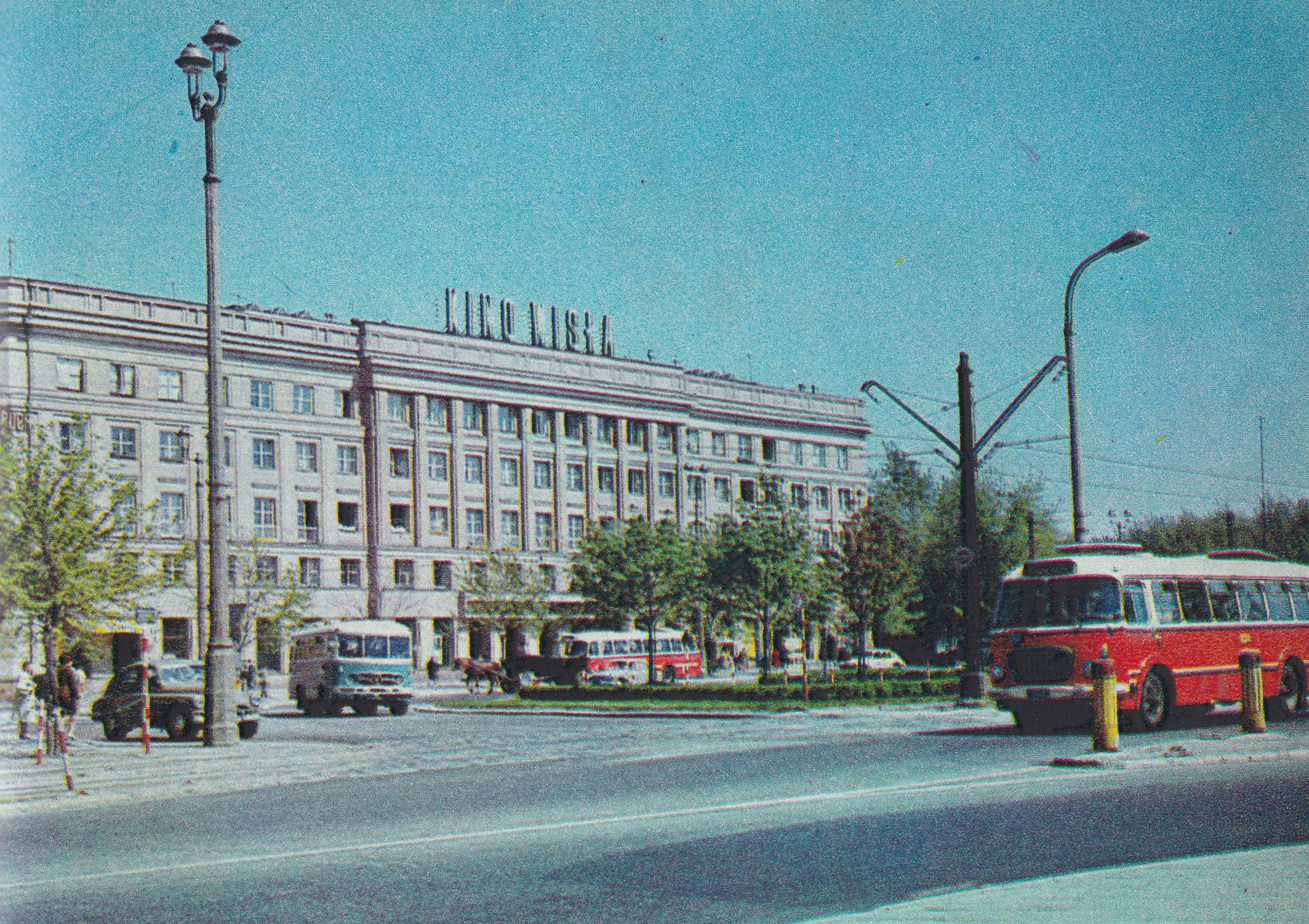
Plac Wilsona in 1960s

During the Warsaw Uprising, one of the first struggles took part in Żoliborz. After the Polish resistance was defeated by Nazi German forces, Żoliborz was spared the fate of the rest of Warsaw and survived the war with less damage than many other areas.

The district has traditionally been where the intelligentsia live. The names of its estates: Żoliborz Dziennikarski (Journalists’ Żoliborz), Żoliborz Oficerski (Officers' Żoliborz), Żoliborz Urzędniczy (Clerks’ Żoliborz) are derived from the former inhabitants professions.

Żoliborz has a lot of acclaimed architecture: old villas and colonies - properties built in the 1930s by the socialist Warsaw Housing Cooperative (WSM), which used to have common laundries, kindergartens and dining-rooms.

The main site of interest in Żoliborz is St. Stanislaus Kostka Church with the tomb of Blessed Father Jerzy Popiełuszko, which during the last 30 years has been visited by approximately 20,000,000 people (among them John Paul II).

== Neighbourhoods ==
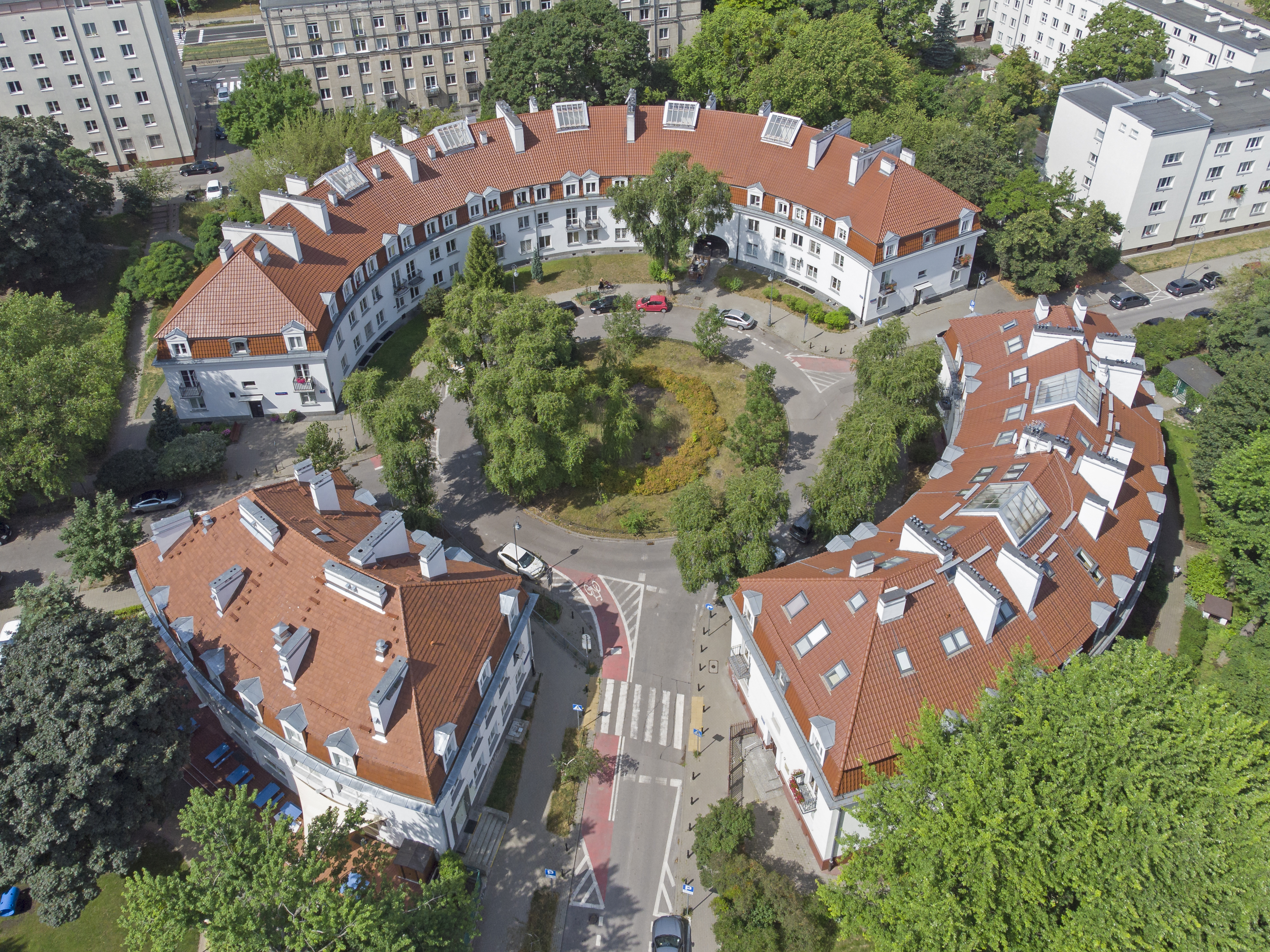
Henkiel Square

According to the Warsaw's street marking system, Żoliborz can be further divided into three neighbourhoods:

- Marymont-Potok
- Sady Żoliborskie
- Stary Żoliborz

== Notable people connected with Żoliborz ==
The list features individuals who were either born or lived in Żoliborz:

- Alina Janowska, actress
- Elisabeth Jerichau-Baumann, painter
- Jarosław Kaczyński, politician and lawyer, Prime Minister of Poland
- Lech Kaczyński, politician and lawyer, Mayor of Warsaw, President of Poland
- Zofia Merle, actress
- Grzegorz Miecugow, journalist, television personality
- Ewa Milewicz, journalist
- Czesław Niemen, musical artist, regarded as one of the most influential Polish singer-songwriters and rock balladeers of the 20th century
- Muniek Staszczyk, singer
- Andrzej Wajda, film and theatre director
- Wojciech Zabłocki, architect and fencer
- Barbara Zbrożyna, sculptor
- Maciej Zembaty, artist, writer and comedian

== Historical and notable sights ==
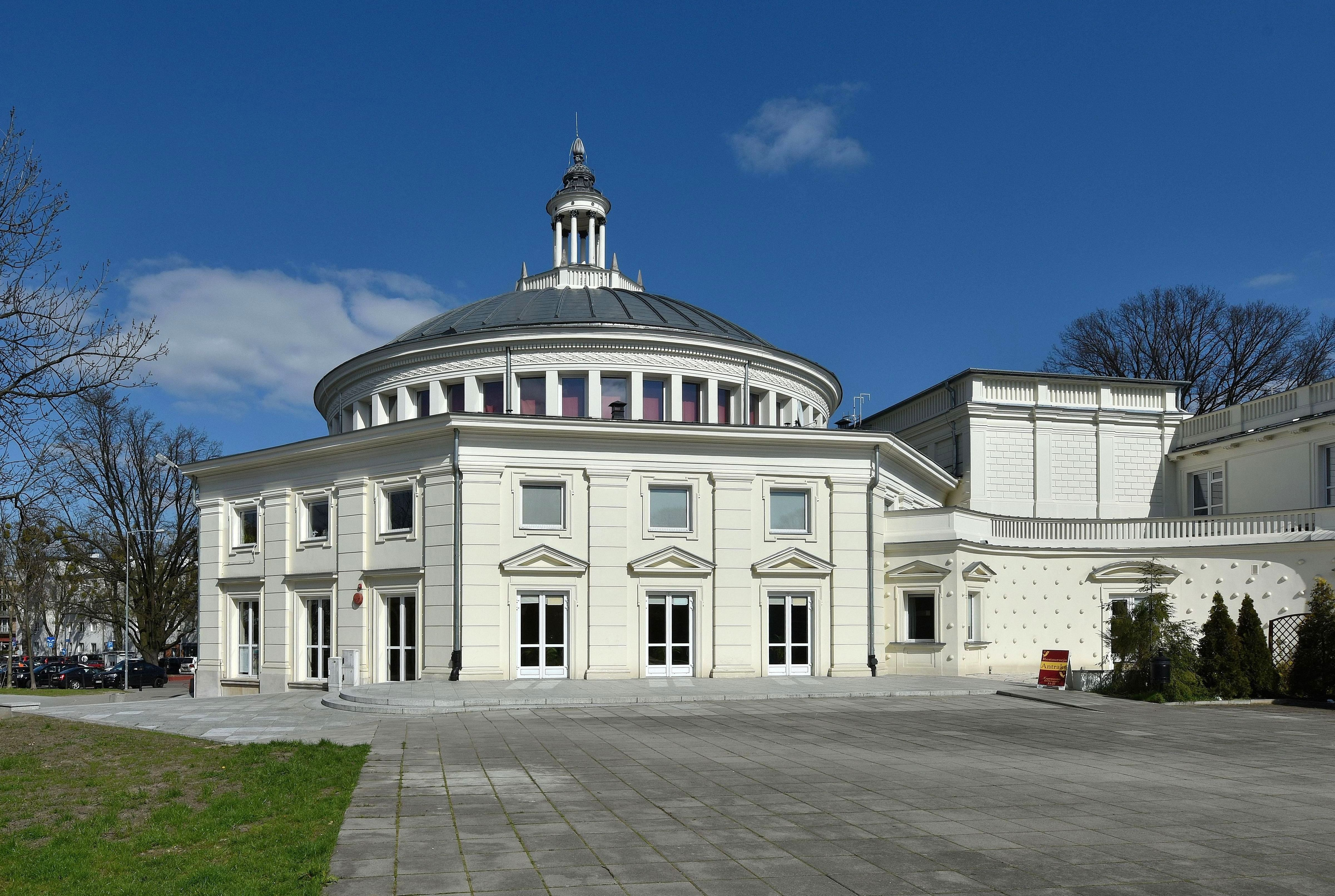
Comedy Theatre in Żoliborz

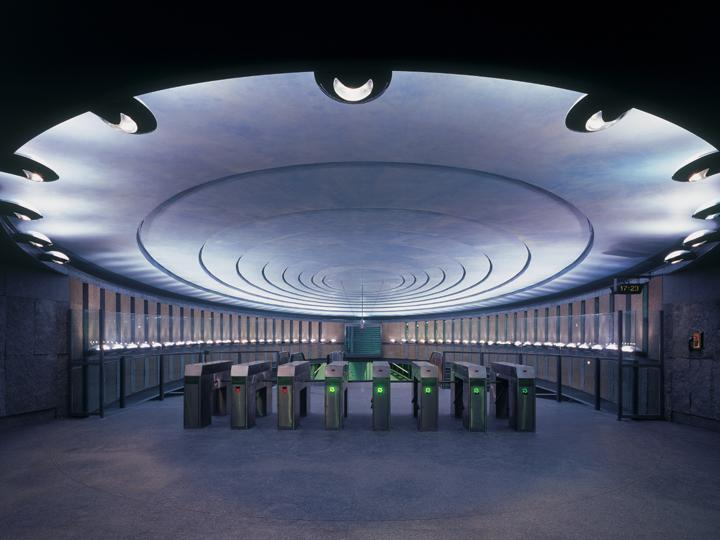
Plac Wilsona metro station

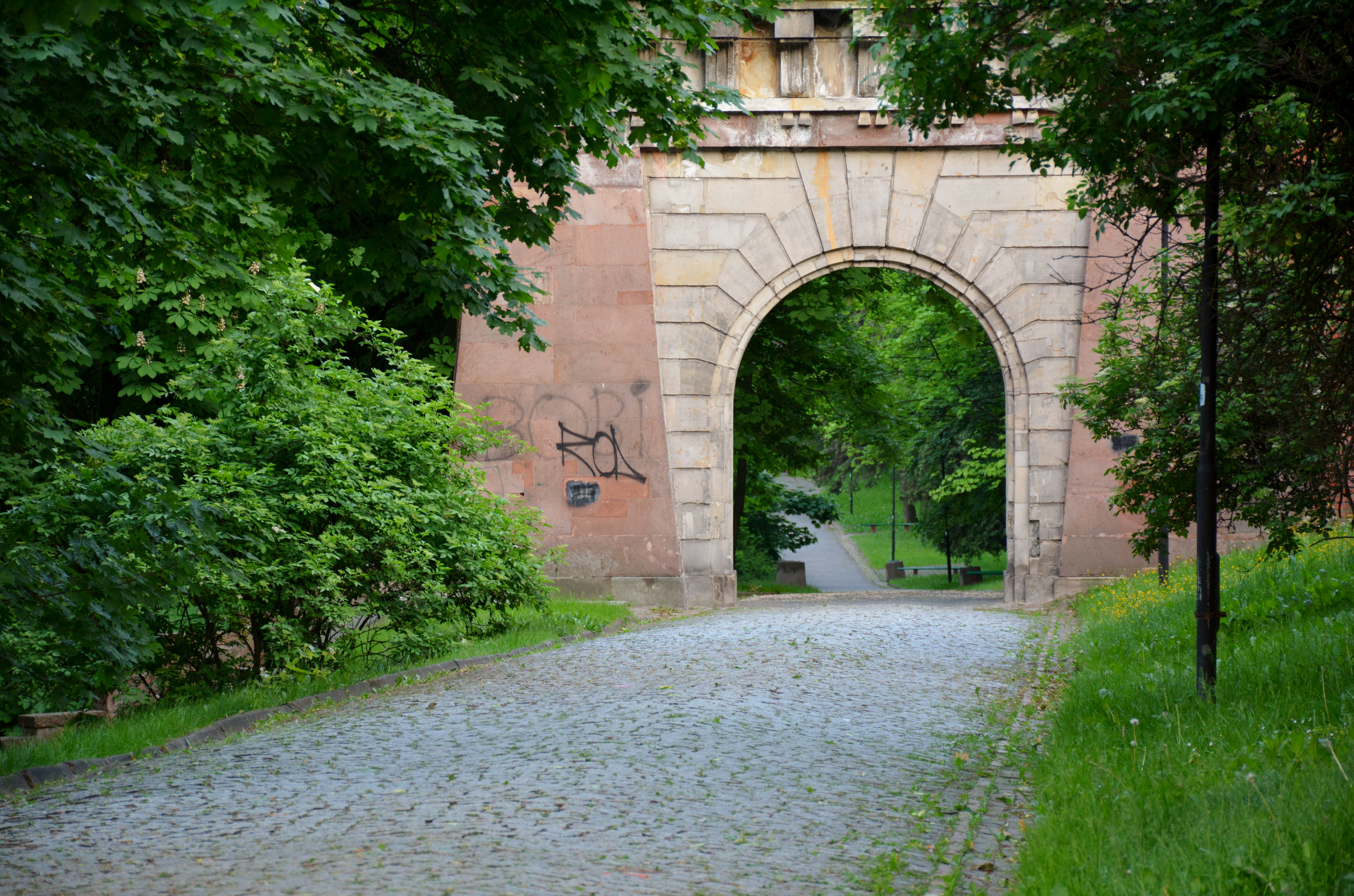
Warsaw Citadel

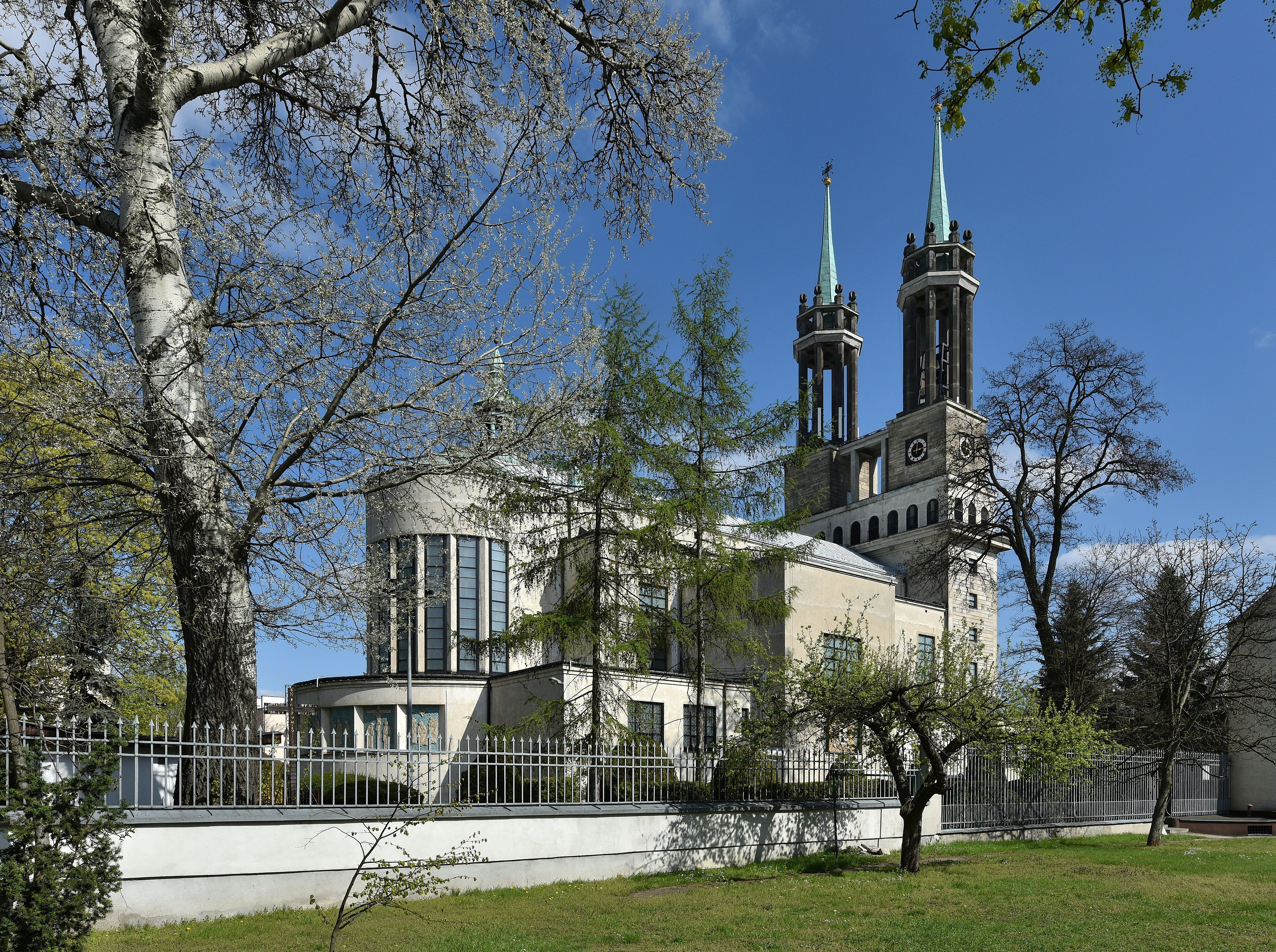
St. Stanislaus Kostka Church

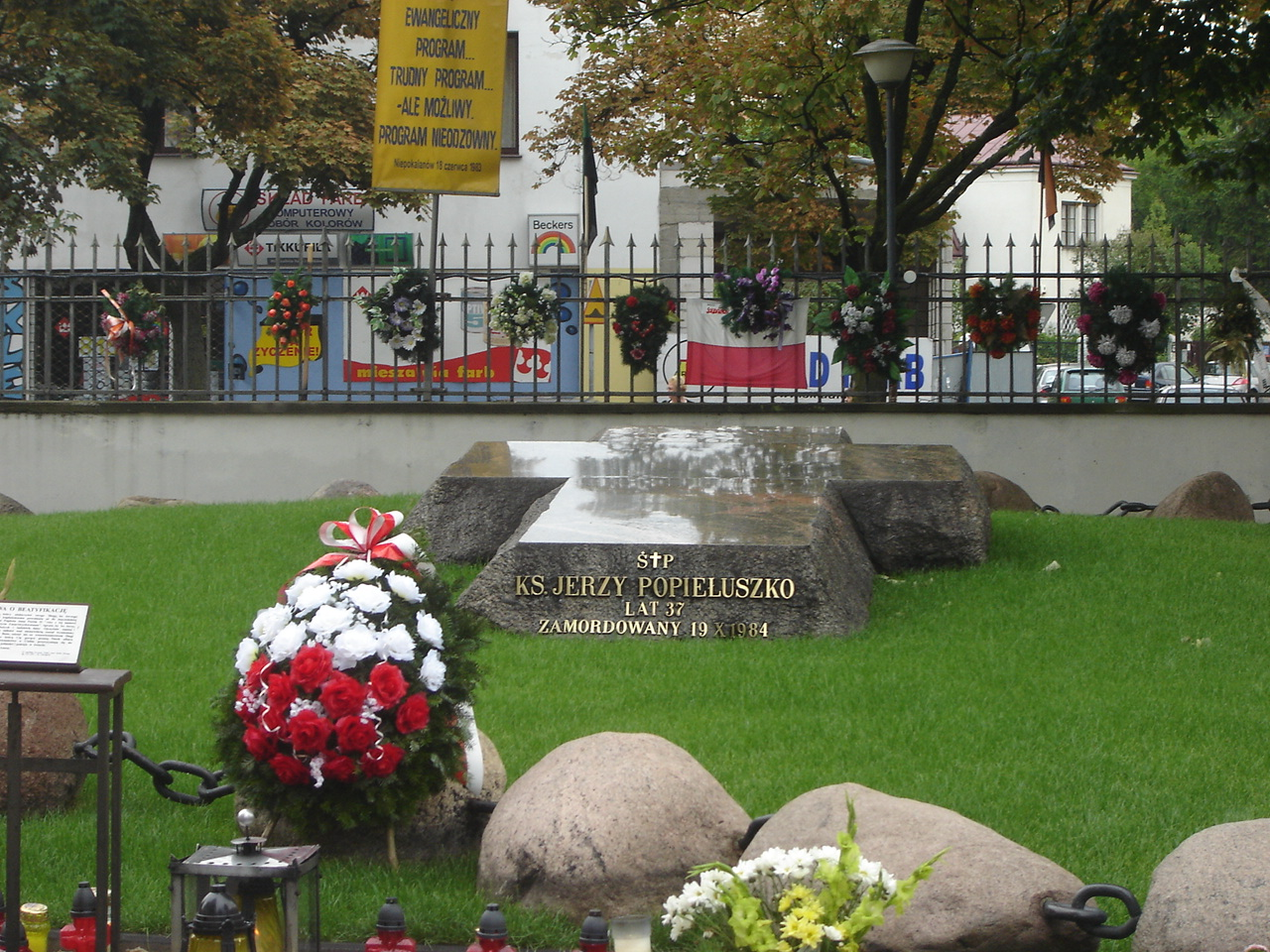
Tomb of Blessed Father Jerzy Popiełuszko

- Churches and temples:
  - Monastery and School of Sisters of the Resurrection
  - Church of Lady Queen of Poland
  - St. Stanislaus Kostka Church
  - Infant Jesus Church
  - St. John Cantius Church
- Cemeteries:
  - Powązki Military Cemetery
- Monuments:
  - Polish 1st Armoured Division Monument at Inwalidów Square
  - Haller's 'Blue Army' Monument at Grunwald Square
  - Monument to AK soldiers fallen in the attack on Gdańsk Station
  - Monument to the Volhynia 27th Home Army Infantry Division
  - Priest Jerzy Popiełuszo Monument at Krasińskiego Street (corner of ks. J. Popiełuszki Street)
  - Stele commemorating Priest Roman Indrzejczyk at Inwalidów Square
  - Witold Pilecki Monument at al. Wojska Polskiego
- Memorials
  - Memorial stone devoted to Jacek Kuroń in Stefan Żeromski Park
  - Plaque at Wybrzeże Gdyńskie Street commemorating soldiers 2nd Warsaw Infantry Division First Polish Army fallen during fighting for bridgeheads during Warsaw Uprising
  - The monument of the Sub-district II of Żoliborz „Żywiciela” at ks. J. Popiełuszki Street
  - Mural at Marii Kazimiery Street commemorating David Bowie visiting Żoliborz. The British artist stayed in Warsaw in 1976 during a trip from Zurich to Moscow. Unnoticed by the crowd, he bought a vinyl record of the Śląsk Song and Dance Ensemble at Wilson Square (then Plac Komuny Square). That was an inspiration for the song Warszawa from the album Low. After the musician's death, a mural was created to commemorate the 40th anniversary of the visit.
- Others
  - Warsaw Citadel
    - X Pawilonu Museum
    - Sokolnicki's Fort
    - Polish Army Museum
    - Museum of Polish History
    - Katyń Museum
  - Museum of Sport and Tourism
- Culture
  - Biblioteka Publiczna w Dzielnicy Żoliborz m.st. Warszawy (local library)
  - Komedia Theatre
  - Wisła Cinema
  - Trzyrzecze Theatre

== See also ==
- Kępa Potocka
