= Kępa Potocka =

Neighbourhood of Warsaw, Poland

- Neighbourhood
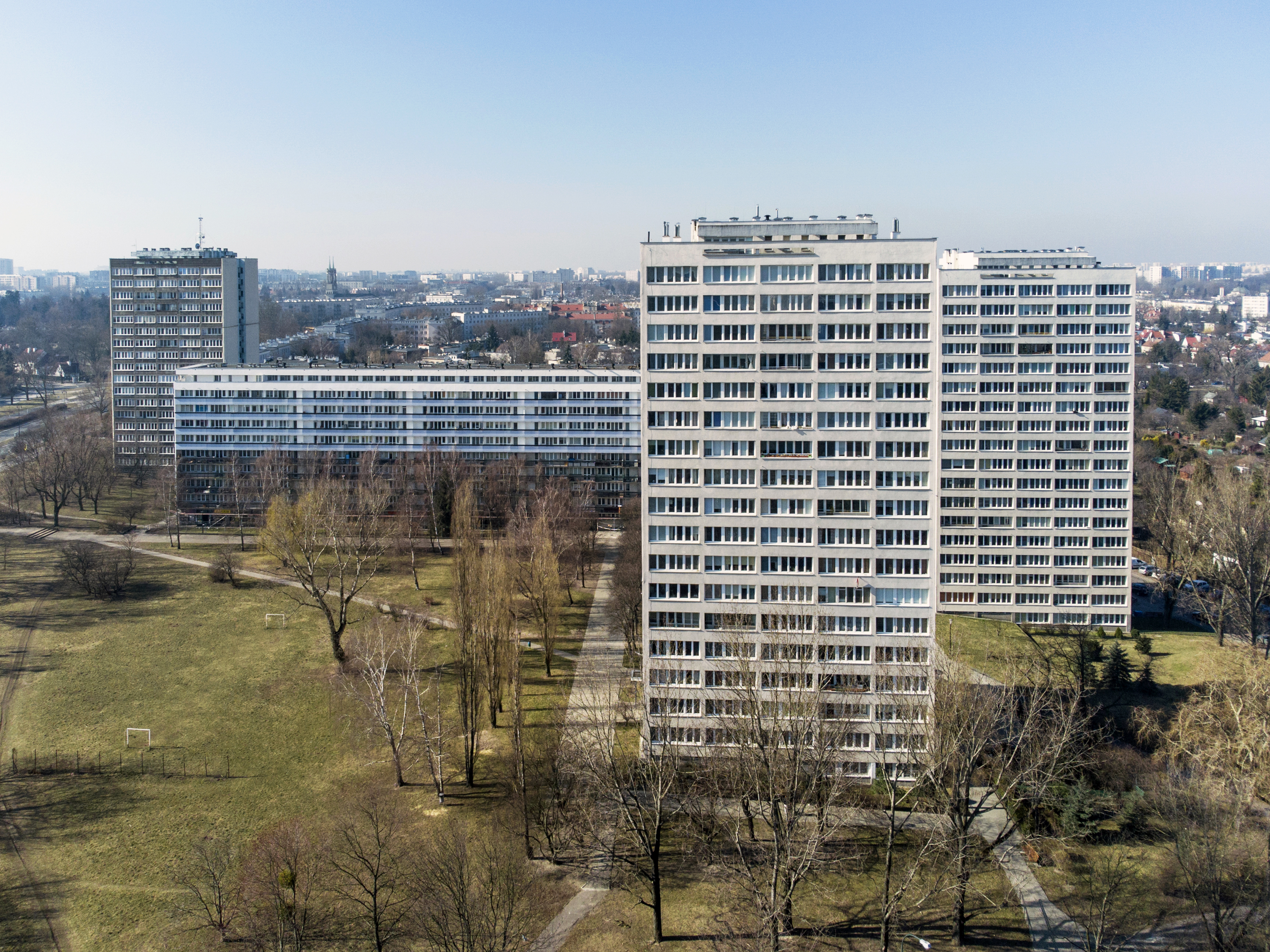
- View of all four buildings of the neighbourhood from the east
- Interactive map of Kępa Potocka
- Country: Poland
- Voivodeship: Masovian
- City and county: Warsaw
- District: Żoliborz
- Establishment: 1969

Area
  - Total: 0.029 km^{2} (0.011 sq mi)

Kępa Potocka is a residential neighbourhood located in the Żoliborz district of Warsaw.

The neighbourhood was built between 1964 and 1969. It consists of four residential buildings designed by Bogusław Chyliński and Hanna Graf-Chylińska: three high-rise tower blocks and a longitudinal building at 5 Promyk Street. The latter was awarded the Mister of Warsaw title in 1969 and was included in the municipal register of monuments in 2019.

== Location and characteristics ==
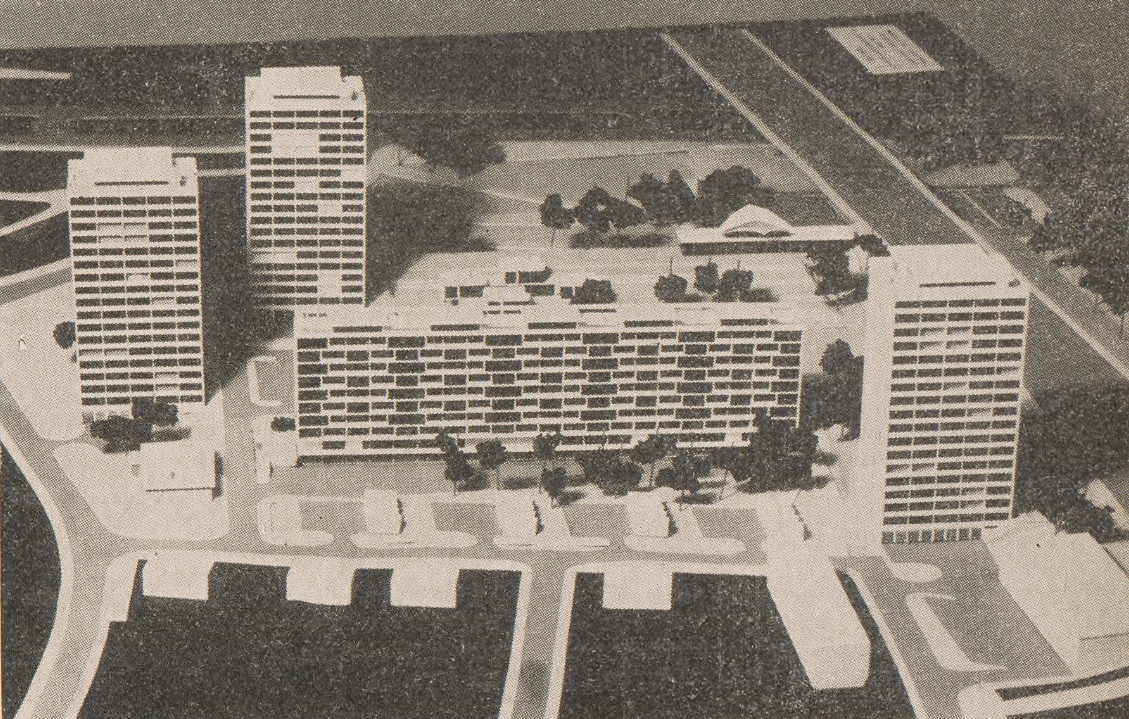
Photo of the model of the Kępa Potocka neighbourhood published in the Architektura monthly in 1965, view from Koźmiana Street

Kępa Potocka is a residential neighbourhood located in the Żoliborz district of Warsaw, specifically in the northern part of the City Information System of Stary Żoliborz. The neighbourhood is situated between Kajetan Koźmian, Zygmunt Krasiński, Wybrzeże Gdyńskie (a segment of the Wisłostrada expressway), Gwiaździsta, and Kazimierz Promyk streets, near the Kępa Potocka Park, which was arranged on the former island of the Vistula river of the same name. The name "Kępa Potocka" originates from the former neighbourhood of Marymont-Potok.

The neighbourhood comprises four multifamily residentials at the following addresses: 1, 3, and 5 Promyk Street, and 2 Koźmiana Street. Three of these buildings are 18-story high-rise towers, while the fourth is an 11-story longitudinal building. The neighbourhood also includes garages and a small service pavilion at 12 Koźmiana Street. It was constructed between 1964 and 1969, with the main architects being Bogusław Chyliński and Hanna Graf-Chylińska, along with a team of collaborators: Zbigniew Pawłowski, Zbigniew Tokarski, Piotr Chomczyk, Władysław Sieradzki, Barbara Tucholska, Z. Nowicki, H. Gładkowski, and J. Nowakowski. A total of 720 apartments were created, intended for between 2,000 and 2,200 residents. The investment was managed by the City Development Authority "Północ", and the housing stock was placed under the administration of the Warsaw Housing Cooperative. As of 2022, the buildings at 1, 3, and 5 Promyk Street are managed by the Warsaw Housing Cooperative "Żoliborz Centralny", while residents of the building at 2 Koźmiana Street established a homeowner association in 1998. The total area of the neighbourhood is about 2.9 hectares.

The preliminary architectural design for this part of the city was created before 1962 as part of the post-war development plans for the Powiśle area. In addition to the main designers, Ewa and Mieczysław Chodaczek also contributed to the original concept. However, some planned features, such as a freestanding café and a kindergarten with a large playground, were never realized. The neighbourhood was built on land where a mound made from post-war rubble had existed. Remnants of this mound were incorporated into the urban layout, in the form of earthen terraces. Before the war, the area housed a fort – Bateria Nadbrzeżna, one of the forts of the Warsaw Citadel, constructed between 1844 and 1850.

In 1970, Kępa Potocka ranked 6th among 34 neighbourhoods in a competition for "leading housing cooperatives".

According to the Encyklopedia Warszawy (1994), the neighbourhood "constitutes an important accent in the panorama of the northern part of the city, viewed from the right bank of the Vistula". The Atlas architektury Warszawy (1977) described it as one of the "most picturesque and well-composed neighbourhoods in Warsaw", while the Stolica magazine in 1972 called it one of the most beautifully situated neighbourhoods, "creating a harmonious silhouette in a part of the city rich in greenery and open space".

== Residential buildings ==
=== Building at 5 Promyk Street ===
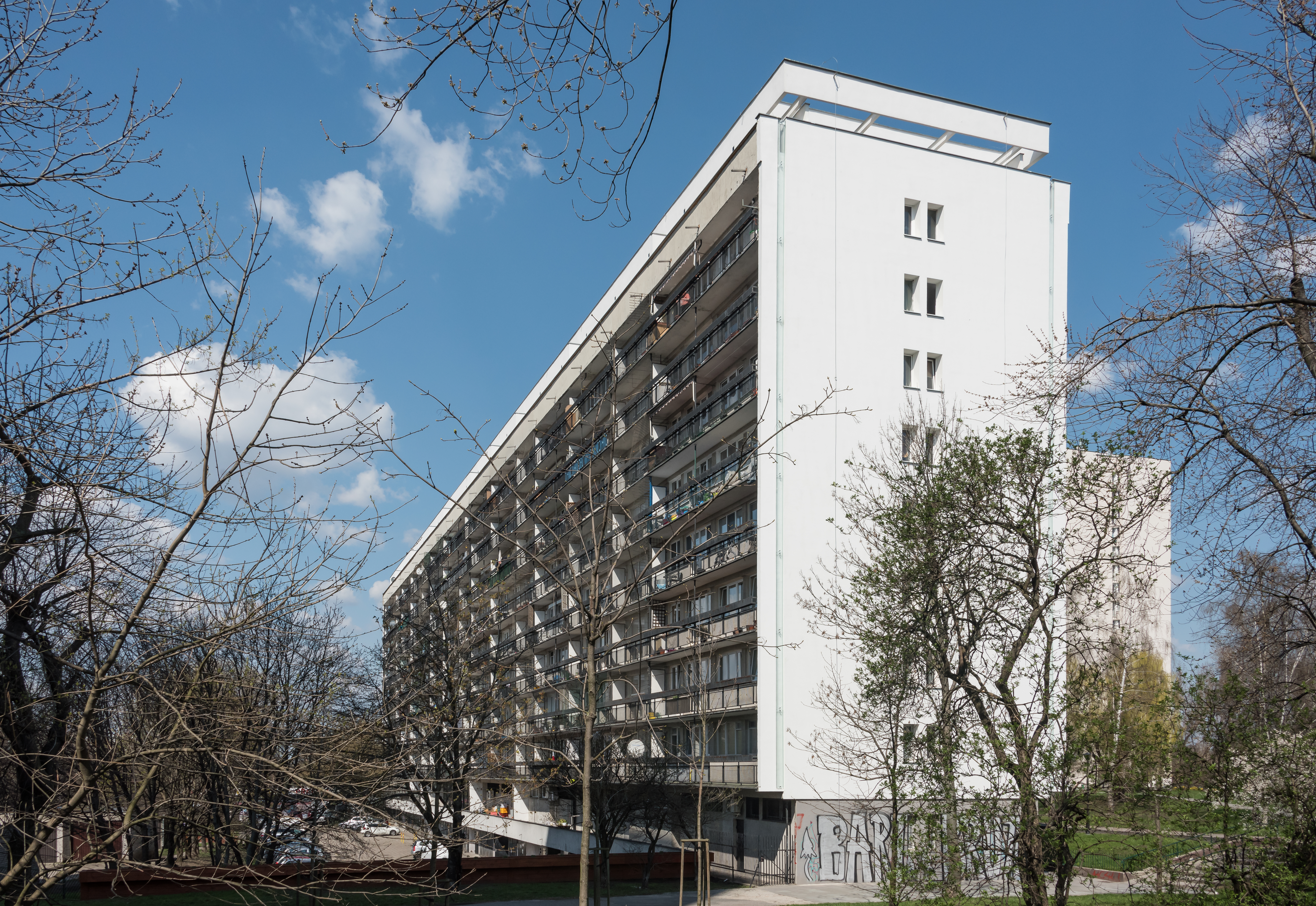
Building at 5 Promyk Street from the south, Mister of Warsaw 1969

The residential building at 5 Promyk Street is colloquially known as "the plank" (deska). It was constructed using monolithic technology with large-scale, adjustable formwork. The general contractor was the Industrialized Construction Company "Północ", while the finishing works were handled by the Finishing Works Company "Muranów". In addition to the architects responsible for the entire neighbourhood, the construction team included Jerzy Zoller. The construction of the building began in 1967, and it was completed and put into use on 30 June 1969.

The building has 11 stories (some sources state 10 stories) and is characterized by a long 110-meter façade. It is oriented roughly along a north-south axis, with long balconies on both sides of the building, creating bands. Above the top floor, there is an openwork concrete roof, an element that gives the entire structure a brutalist appearance. The building contains 196 apartments, arranged in a stairwell layout with types M-1, M-2, M-4, and M-5. The ground floor includes high, glazed service premises (including a neighborhood club), administrative rooms, and garages. The building's volume is 39,718 m³. At the back of the building, on the western side, there are garage buildings made of gray brick arranged in a stepped pattern.

The building was awarded the title of Mister of Warsaw 1969 in the residential construction category in a competition organized by the Życie Warszawy newspaper. Reasons for awarding the prize included the functional apartments, urban qualities, and the building's picturesque location surrounded by taller neighboring buildings. Among the finalists in this category were buildings at 6 Markowska Street and 8 Zabłociańska Street. In 1969, the Mister of Warsaw title was exceptionally awarded to three objects on the occasion of the 25th anniversary of the competition − 5 Promyk Street won it ex aequo with the Warszawa Wschodnia railway station and the kindergarten at 3 Jasielska Street.

In 2019, a book was published about the building and its residents titled Czuły Modernizm. Społeczna historia Mistera Warszawy. 50 lat razem (Tender Modernism: A Social History of Mister of Warsaw. 50 Years Together), edited by art historians Emilia Kiecko and Wiktoria Szczupacka.

On 18 October 2019, the building was entered into the municipal register of monuments of the City of Warsaw (ID: ZOL35259) as a valuable example of post-war modernism.

=== Three high-rises ===
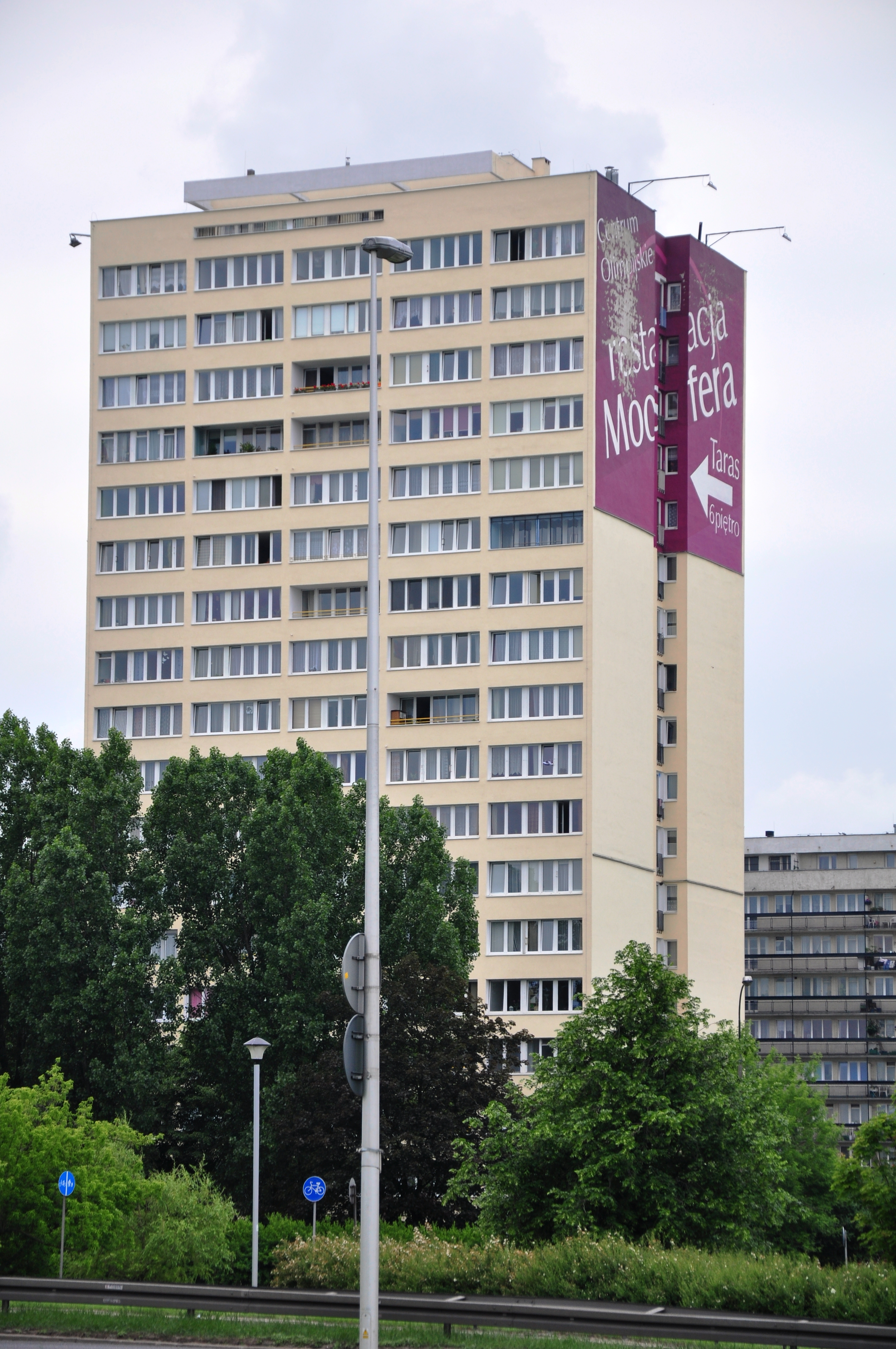
Building at 1 Promyk Street. Irregularly arranged loggias are visible

The neighbourhood features three identical multi-family residential buildings, each with 18 floors. Their addresses are 1 and 3 Promyk Street and 2 Koźmiana Street. The buildings were constructed using monolithic technology with a climbing formwork method. The design and subsequent construction process was an experiment to test the possibility of building taller structures using this method, as well as to explore the potential of using prefabricated facade elements. In the early years of operation, the buildings experienced problems with leaks in the walls and roof, leading to the need for roof replacements. The repeatable design tested on Kępa Potocka was later adapted and used in the design of a building for employees of the Staszic Mine in Katowice (Górnik I).

Each building contains approximately 175 apartments in types M-2, M-3, and M-4, with a majority of M-3 apartments. The total area of apartments in each building is about 4,600 m², and the volume of each building is approximately 27,400 m³. Each building is equipped with three elevators. One of the buildings is built directly on the ground, while two are anchored with piles. On the ground floor, in addition to the apartments, there are also garages, storage rooms, and technical spaces. The top floors are also designed with technical functions, including laundry rooms and water tanks. The facades are simplified, with windows on two sides and solid walls on the other two, although irregularly placed loggias add some variation to the design.

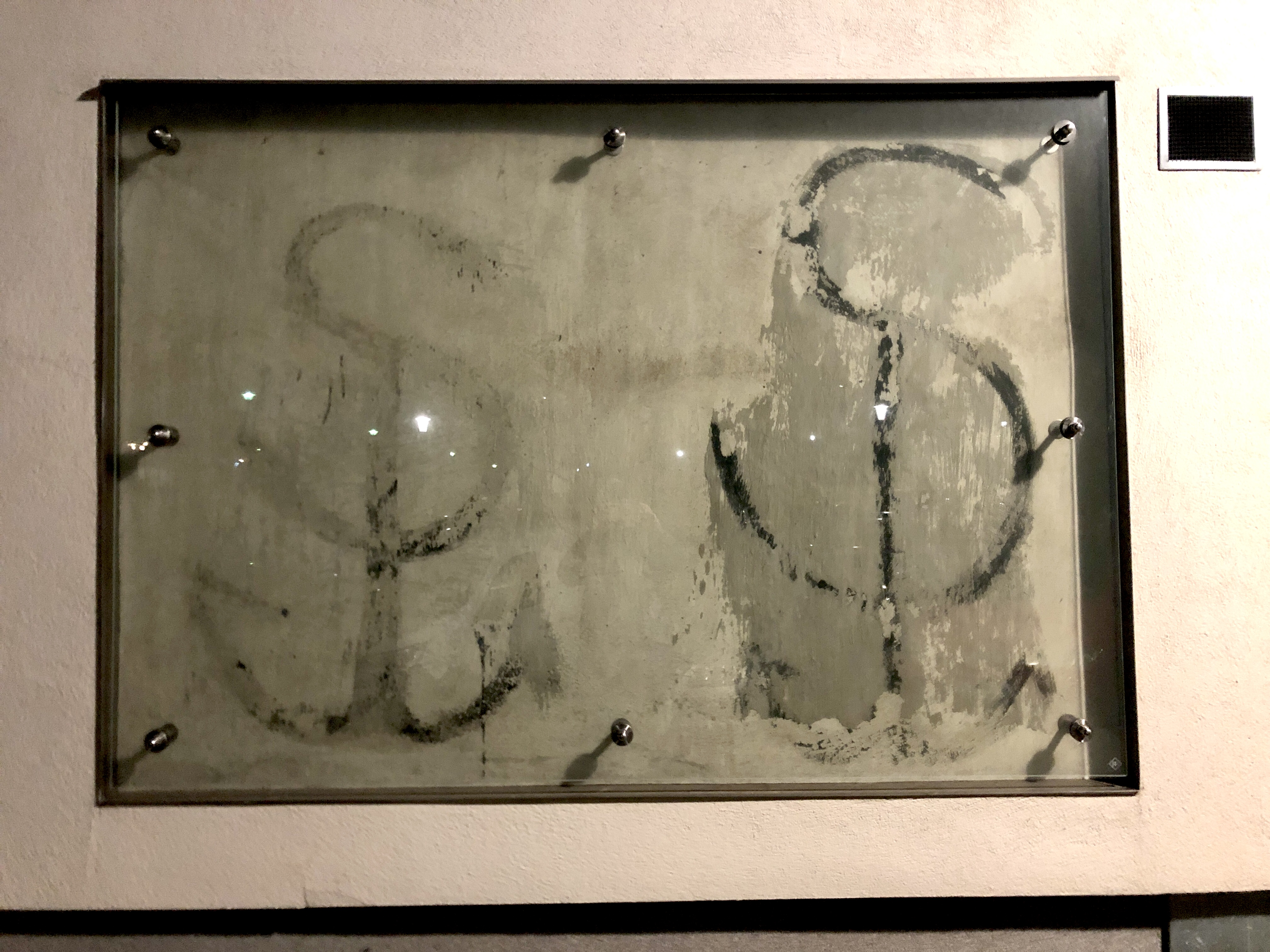
Symbols of Fighting Solidarity on the façade of the building at 3 Promyk Street, listed in the Registry of Cultural Property

On the southern facade of the building at 3 Promyk Street, graffiti in the form of two symbols of the Fighting Solidarity appeared in the 1980s. These symbols were later partially painted over, covered with cement mortar, and later shielded with a plastic panel for preservation. In January 2019, the Mazovian Provincial Conservator of Monuments decided to enter both remnants of the paintings into the Registry of Cultural Property due to their unique character and significant historical value.
