= Milewicz =

Milewicz is a Polish surname. Notable people with the surname include:

- Ewa Milewicz (born 1948), Polish print journalist
- Waldemar Milewicz (1956–2004), Polish journalist and war correspondent
