= Museum of the Polish People's Republic =

Institution in Kraków, Poland

Coordinates: 50°04′11″N 20°02′28″E

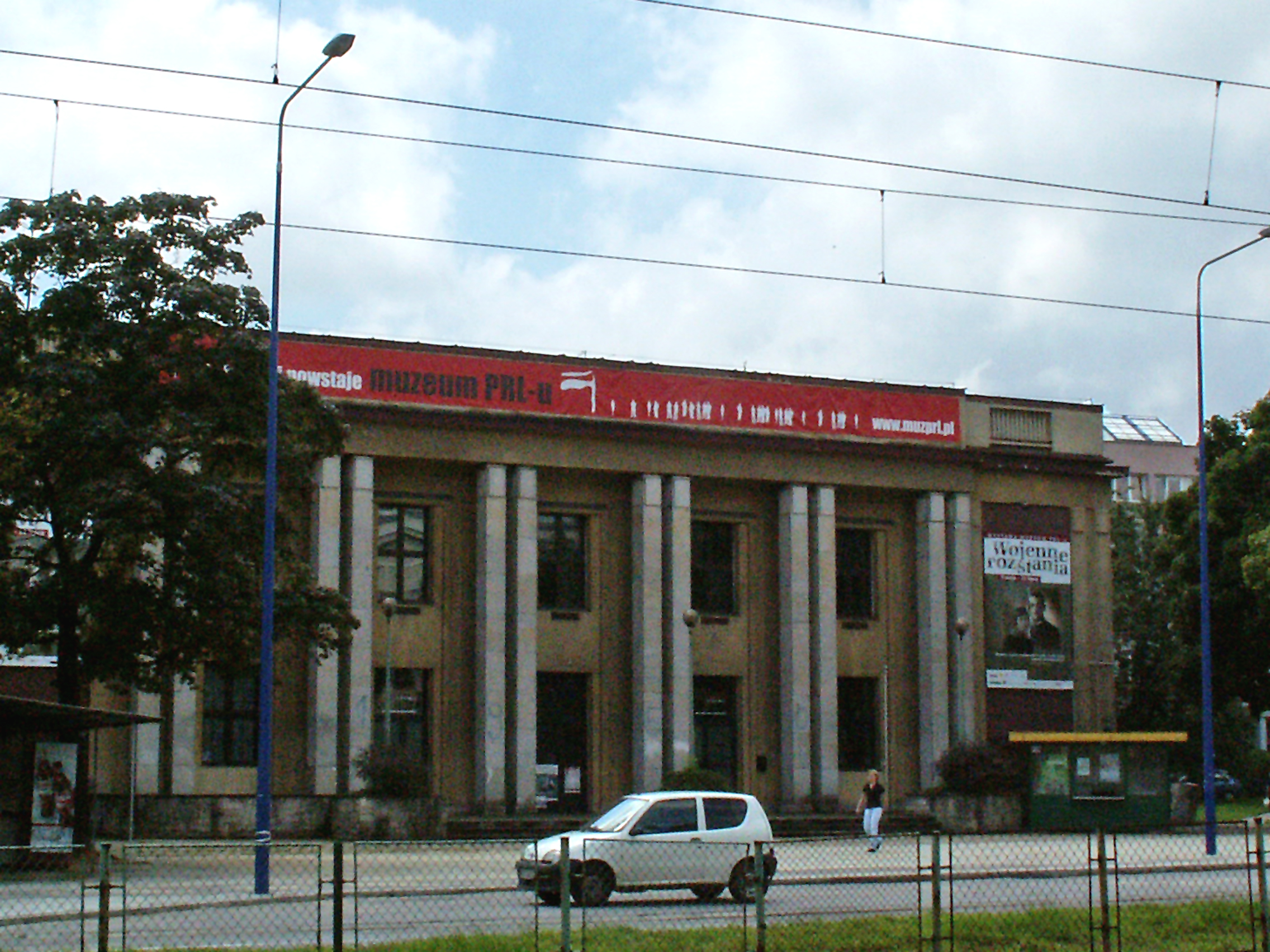

The Museum of the Polish People's Republic (Polish: Muzeum PRL-u) was a museum in Kraków, Poland devoted to documenting the forty-year history of the communist People's Republic of Poland (PRL). The museum had originally been established in 2008 as a department of the Museum of Polish History in Warsaw. However, in November 2012 the city council of Kraków decided to set up an independent museum in its place, run by the city itself. The new museum opened in the old Kino Światowid ("Svetovid Cinema"), a formerly state-owned cinema in the Nowa Huta district of Kraków, where it ran exhibitions and offered guided tours through the nuclear bunkers of Nowa Huta. The museum was closed in 2019 and was replaced by the Nowa Huta Museum on the same site.
