= St. Stanislaus Kostka Church, Warsaw =

Parish church in Warsaw, Poland

Coordinates: 52.2677°N 20.9840°E

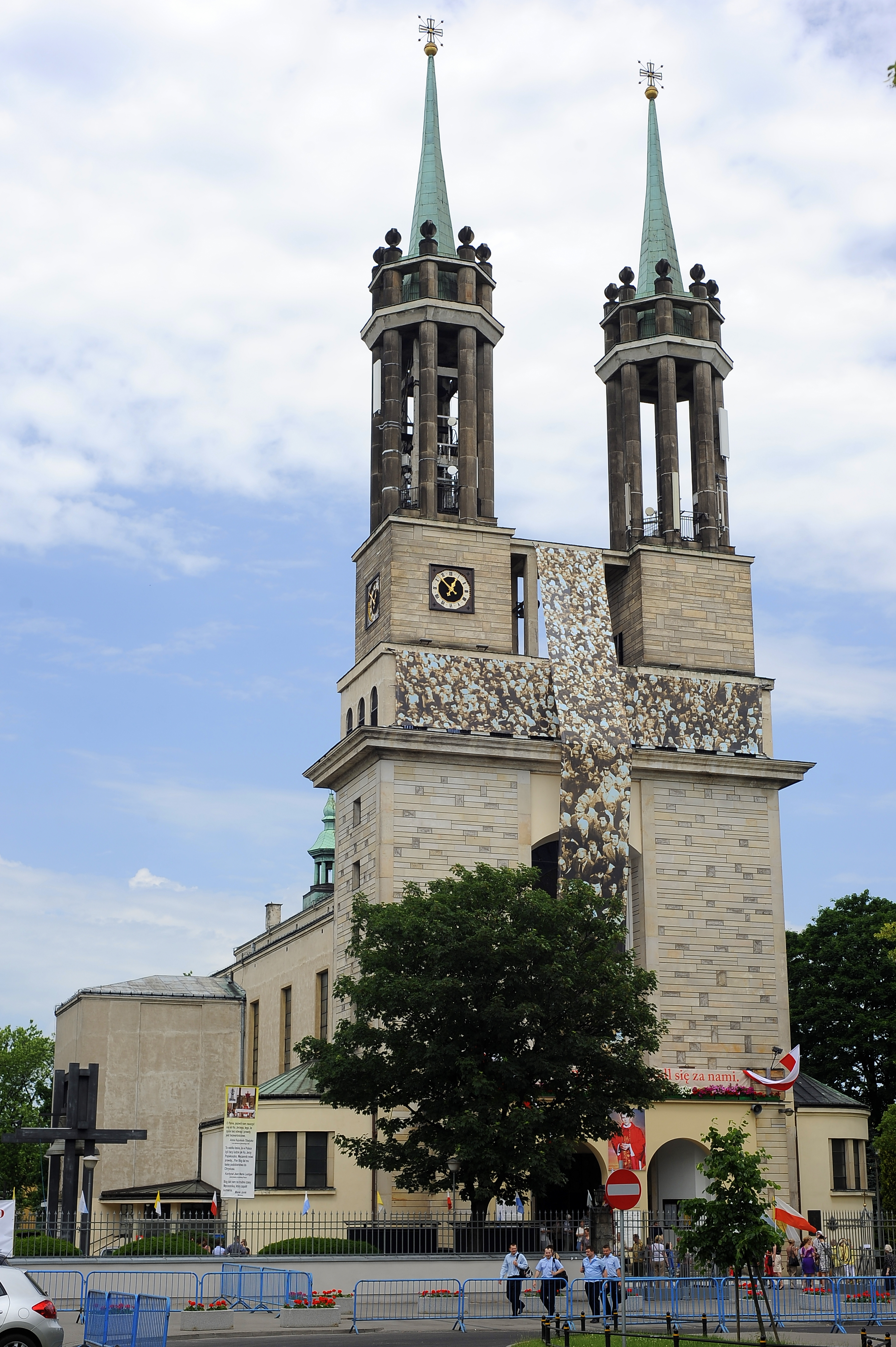
Church of St. Stanislaus Kostka

Saint Stanislaus Kostka Church is a parish church in Warsaw, Poland, located at Hozjusz Street 2 near Plac Wilsona. It is the most significant church in the Żoliborz district. It is dedicated to St. Stanislaus Kostka, a 16th-century Jesuit.

The parish was created in 1927 in the area on the northern outskirts of city, which was the site of significant development during the interbellum period. Construction on the monumental Neo-Romanesque church building began in 1930, but was interrupted by World War II, and not completed until 1963.

The church is the well-known Sanctuary of Blessed Jerzy Popiełuszko, who was the spiritual leader of Solidarność and was killed by the Communists in 1984. From 1980 he conducted very popular Masses for the Fatherland that became a kind of manifesto for the social movement and protesters, attracting people from all around Poland. This is also the place of his burial, and his grave is situated beside the church. The site was visited by Pope John Paul II in 1987. An estimated 20,000,000 people from over 100 countries have visited.

== History ==
=== Construction of the church ===
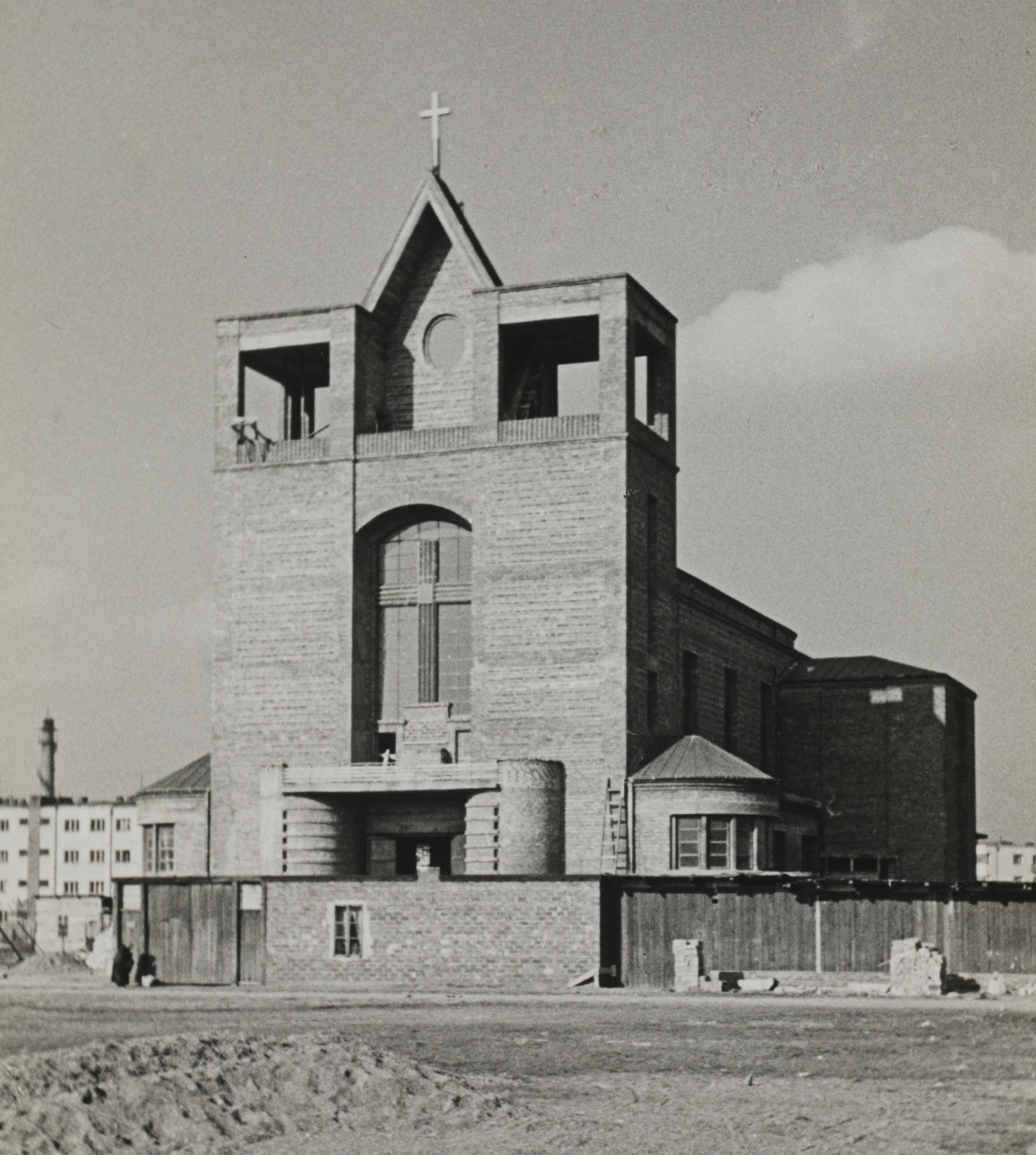
Construction of the church in the 1930s

The Church of St. Stanislaus Kostka in Warsaw’s Żoliborz district was built in the interwar period. According to some sources, the church’s foundation was connected to the celebration of the 250th anniversary of the Battle of Vienna and King John III Sobieski’s victory over Kara Mustafa’s army. Construction began in 1930, preceded by drainage work to dry the area, as the church was built near the former bed of the Pólkówka stream. The designer of the church was architect Łukasz Wolski.

During the Siege of Warsaw in September 1939, the church was damaged by artillery shells and aerial bombs.

During the Warsaw Uprising, the unfinished church’s basement served as a hospital for insurgents. The church was partially destroyed during the fighting for Żoliborz. After World War II, construction resumed under a new design by Edgar Aleksander Norwerth. On September 7, 1963, the church was consecrated by Cardinal Stefan Wyszyński.

=== Masses for the Homeland (Msze za Ojczyznę) ===
Between 1974 and 1987, the parish priest of St. Stanislaus Kostka was Fr. Teofil Bogucki, who was actively involved in the opposition movement. From 1980 to 1984, Fr. Jerzy Popiełuszko served as a resident priest of the parish. Beginning in October 1980, at the initiative of the parish priest, Fr. Popiełuszko and other clergymen celebrated monthly “Masses for the Homeland” (Msze za Ojczyznę) at the church.

Between 1982 and 1984, these liturgies became patriotic demonstrations, attracting crowds from across Warsaw and all of Poland.

Two weeks after Fr. Popiełuszko’s death—he was murdered by officers of the communist Security Service (SB)—his funeral was held on November 3, 1984, at St. Stanislaus Kostka Church. Like the “Masses for the Homeland,” the ceremony drew thousands of faithful.

=== Jubilee Church ===
Between 1999 and 2001, in connection with Pope John Paul II’s proclamation of the Jubilee Year, St. Stanislaus Kostka Parish Church served as a Jubilee Temple. On May 17, 2000, a solemn Mass was celebrated there with the participation of members of the Polish Episcopate.

In 2000, the church underwent renovation work and the presbytery was rebuilt.

On October 19, 2010, Archbishop of Warsaw Kazimierz Nycz elevated the church to the rank of Diocesan Sanctuary of Blessed Fr. Jerzy Popiełuszko. The archbishop designated the following days for gaining a plenary indulgence:

- April 23 – Feast day of St. George (Jerzy’s name day),
- June 6 – Anniversary of the beatification ceremony,
- October 19 – Liturgical memorial of Blessed Jerzy Popiełuszko.

=== Place of pilgrimage ===
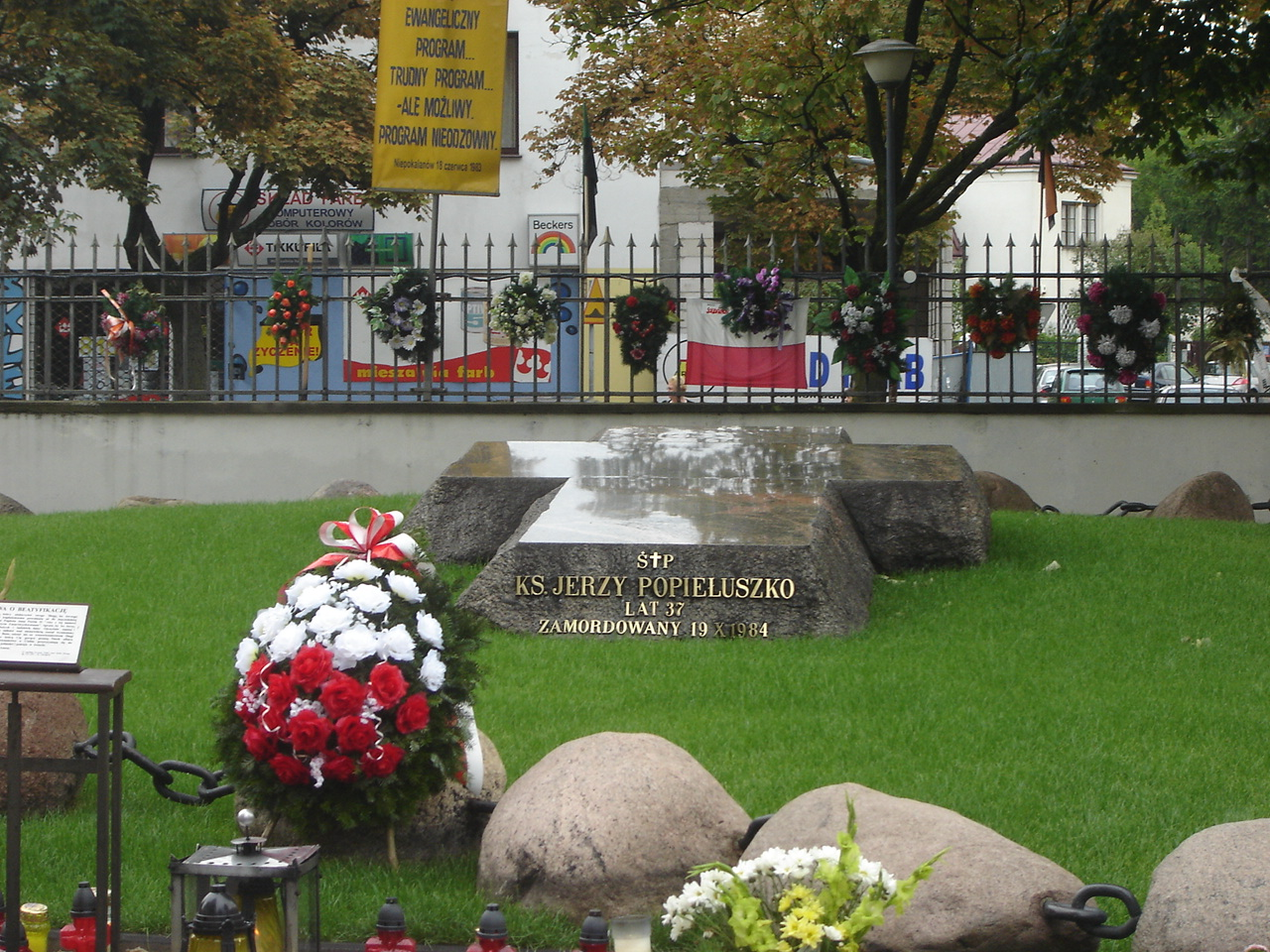
Tomb of Blessed Father Jerzy Popiełuszko

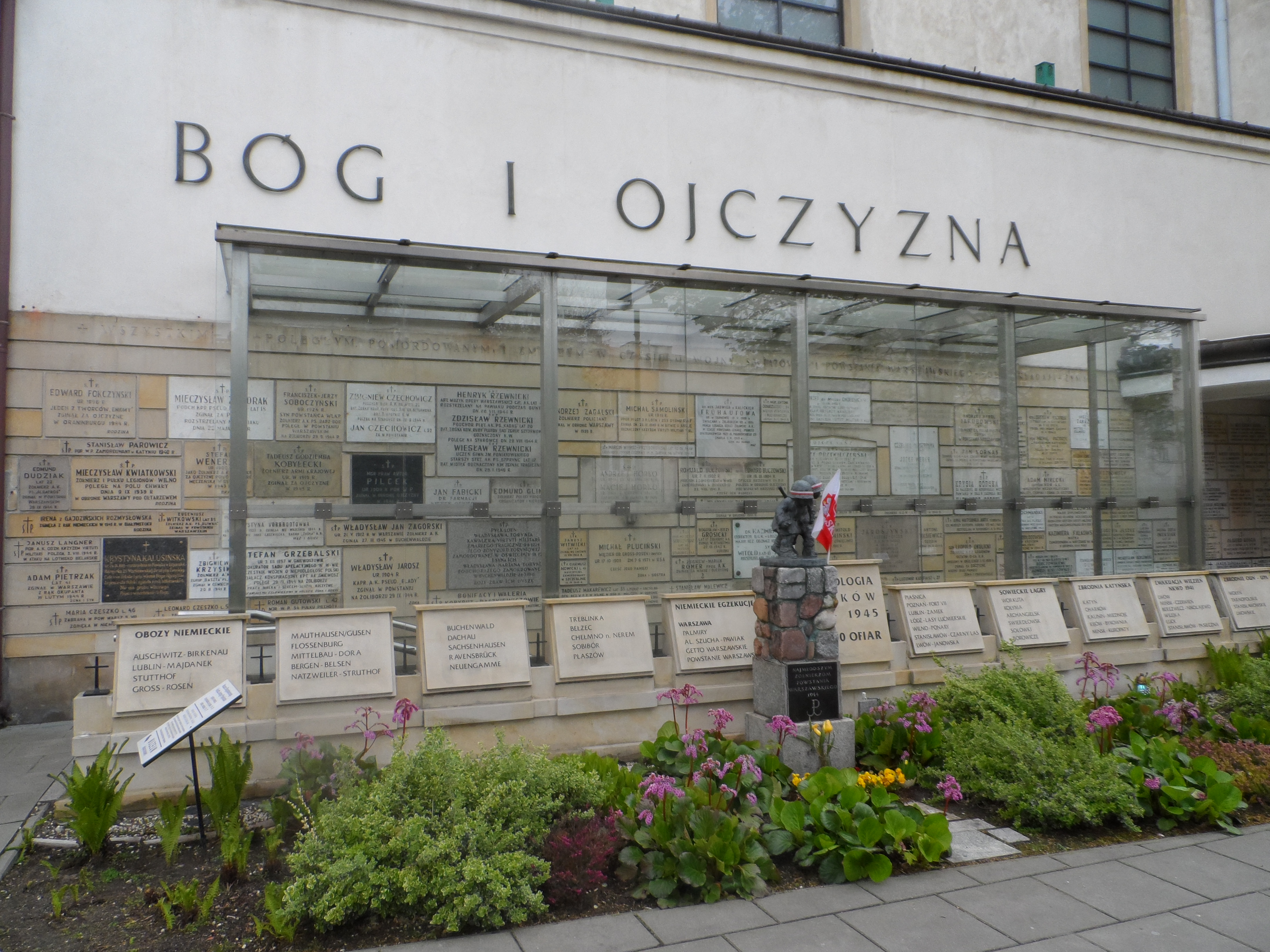
Wall of Remembrance at the wall of the church of St. Stanislaus Kostka

Since 1984, the church has become a place of pilgrimage for all who visit the grave of Blessed Fr. Jerzy Popiełuszko, located in front of the church façade. On June 14, 1987, Pope John Paul II visited the site.

On October 19, 2004, on the anniversary of Fr. Popiełuszko’s death, a solemn Mass was held at the church, attended by over 20,000 worshippers. At the same time, a museum dedicated to Fr. Popiełuszko was opened in the church’s basement.

The museum houses personal belongings and memorabilia of the priest, displayed in several rooms beneath the church. One room symbolizes the site of his murder and the disposal of his body in the water. A film showing the recovery of his body leaves a powerful impression on visitors. In a display case on the wall are the clothes he wore on the day of his murder, a police baton used to beat him, and the rope that bound his hands. The museum also contains numerous other personal items from his life, including his cradle, documents, and small personal effects. Another room displays photographs from his funeral.

Buried in the church grounds are also former parish priests Teofil Bogucki and Zygmunt Malacki.

The church has also served as a film location for the biographical films “Popiełuszko: Freedom Is Within Us” (2009) and “Leave No Traces” (2021).

== Architecture ==
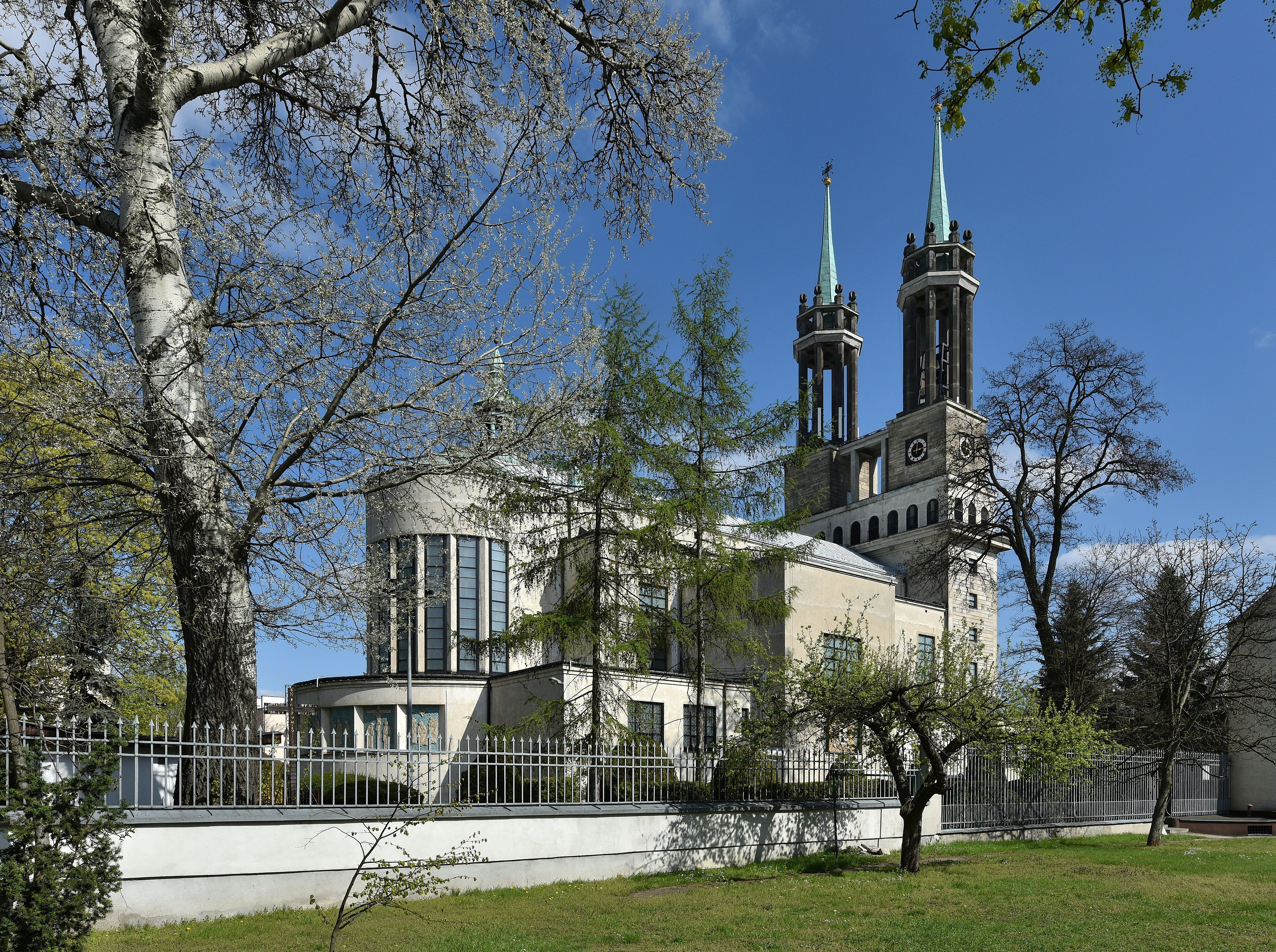
The church from the north-west

The Church of St. Stanislaus Kostka is a monumental twin-towered structure built in the modernist style with Neo-Romanesque elements. The architect’s concept aimed to combine modern architectural design with the traditional forms of early Christian basilicas.

The church interior is three-aisled, featuring two large chapels — one dedicated to the Blessed Virgin Mary and the other to the Sacred Heart of Jesus. Around the presbytery runs an ambulatory, and above the main altar there is a baldachin (canopy).

=== Interior ===
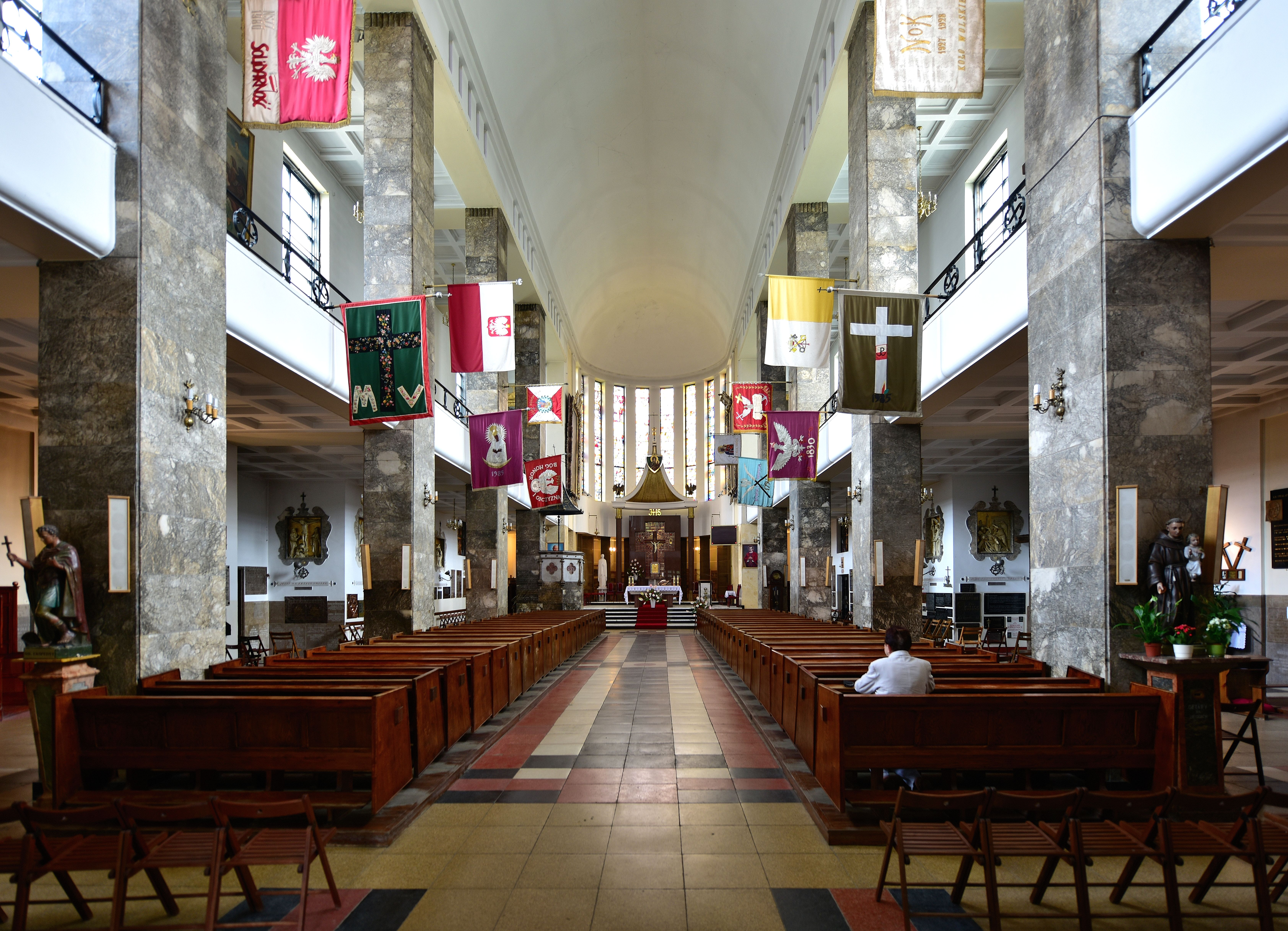
Interior of the church

The interior décor forms a cohesive composition that reflects the life motto of the parish’s long-time pastor, Fr. Teofil Bogucki — “God and Homeland” (Bóg i Ojczyzna). The nave walls are lined with numerous commemorative plaques.

The stained-glass windows in the presbytery depict a succinct history of Poland and the Catholic Church in the country. The main nave is adorned with banners symbolizing the nation’s struggle for independence.

Inside the church are two 17th-century paintings by the Silesian artist Michael Leopold Willmann (St. Paul and The Martyrdom of St. Peter), as well as a sculpture titled “Angel of the Resurrection”, created by Bolesław Syrewicz in 1869.

The church also houses a pipe organ built in 1928 by the organ builder Wacław Biernacki.
