= Museum of Polish History =

Coordinates: 52°13′48″N 20°58′45″E

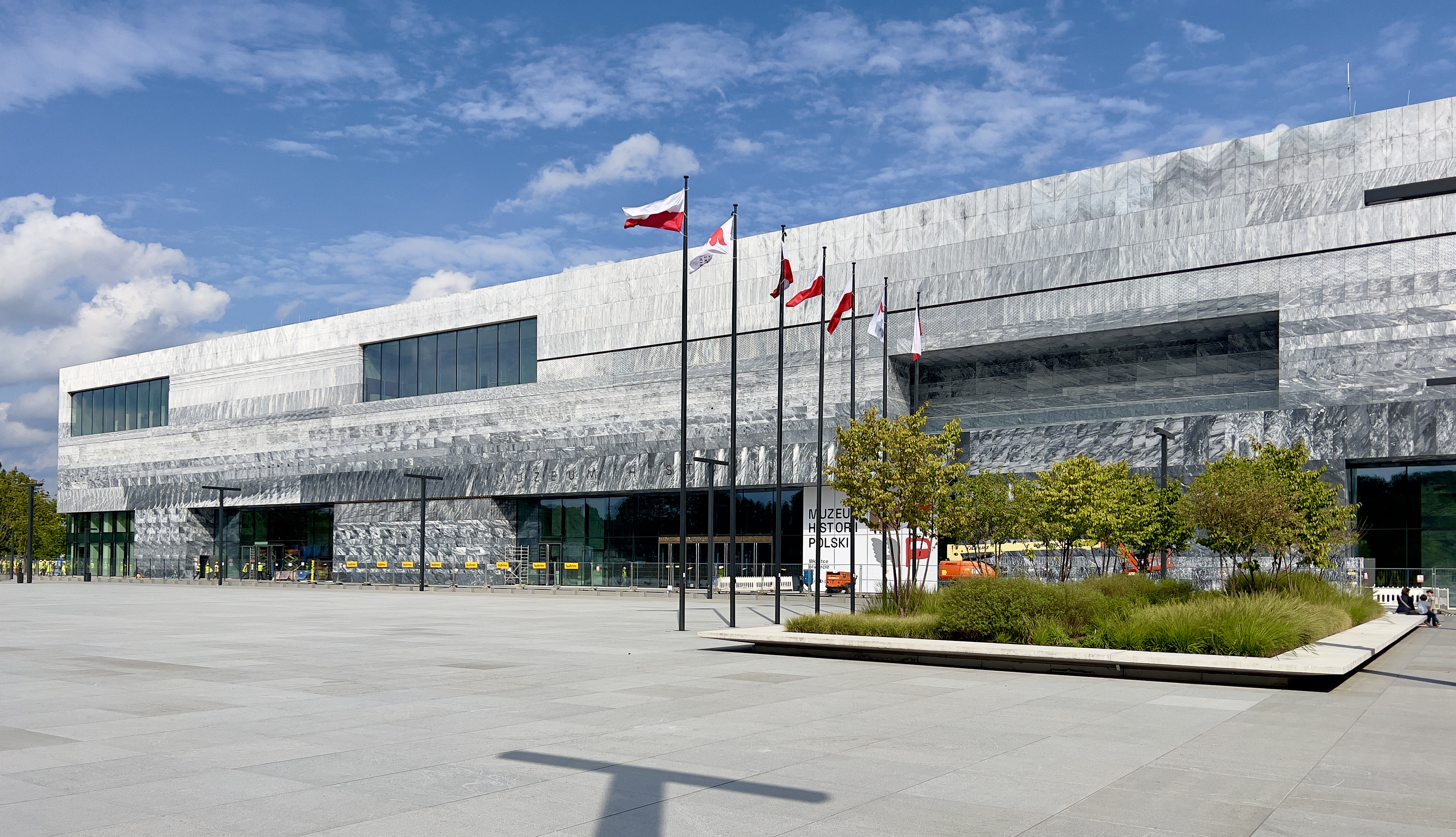
- The museum building at the site of the Warsaw Citadel, 2023
- Established: 2006
- Location: Plac Gwardii Pieszej Koronnej; Warsaw, Poland
- Type: history museum
- Director: Marcin Napiórkowski
- Public transit access: Dworzec Gdański
- Website: muzhp.pl

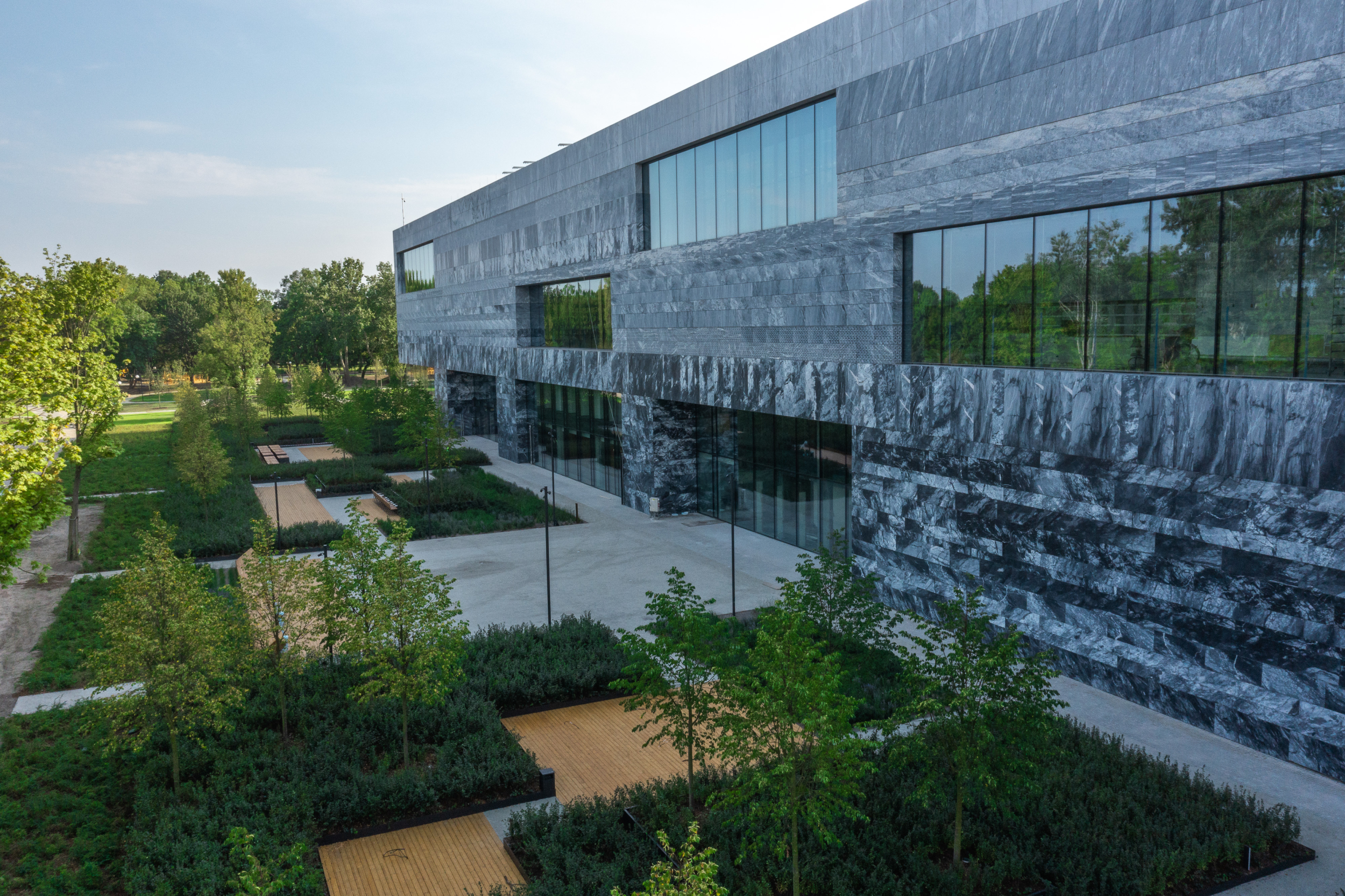
Eastern elevation of the museum

The Museum of Polish History or the Polish History Museum (Polish: Muzeum Historii Polski) is a museum and national cultural institute in Warsaw, Poland. The purpose of the museum is to present the most important events in Polish history, with a particular emphasis on Polish traditions of freedom. Since September 2023, the new museum building has been located in the Warsaw Citadel.

== History ==
The statute establishing the museum was signed on 2 May 2006 at the Royal Castle in Warsaw by the then-Minister of Culture and National Heritage, Kazimierz Michał Ujazdowski, in the presence of Warsaw city president Kazimierz Marcinkiewicz.

The opening of the permanent exhibition was originally planned for 2012–2013, but in view of the difficulties with constructing a permanent headquarters and finding a temporary headquarters, Minister of Culture and National Heritage Bogdan Zdrojewski decided to delay the opening until 2018. The museum was once planned be built on Trasa Lazienkowska near the Ujazdów Castle in Warsaw. A competition for the design of the new building was held, and the winner was chosen on 6 December 2009. The designer of the winning concept was Paczowski et Fritsch Architectes from Luxembourg, of which Polish architect Bohdan Paczkowski is a partner. The winner of the competition to design the exhibition, announced in 2011, is WWAA/Platige Image.

Until the first part of 2013, the museum also had a division in Kraków in the former Kino Światowid building, which was planned as the site of the Muzeum PRL-u (Polish People's Republic Museum). On 7 November the City Council of Kraków adopted a resolution to turn this branch into an independent museum which is to be funded directly by the city. Therefore, the director of the Museum of Polish History decided to officially close the Kraków branch in early 2013.

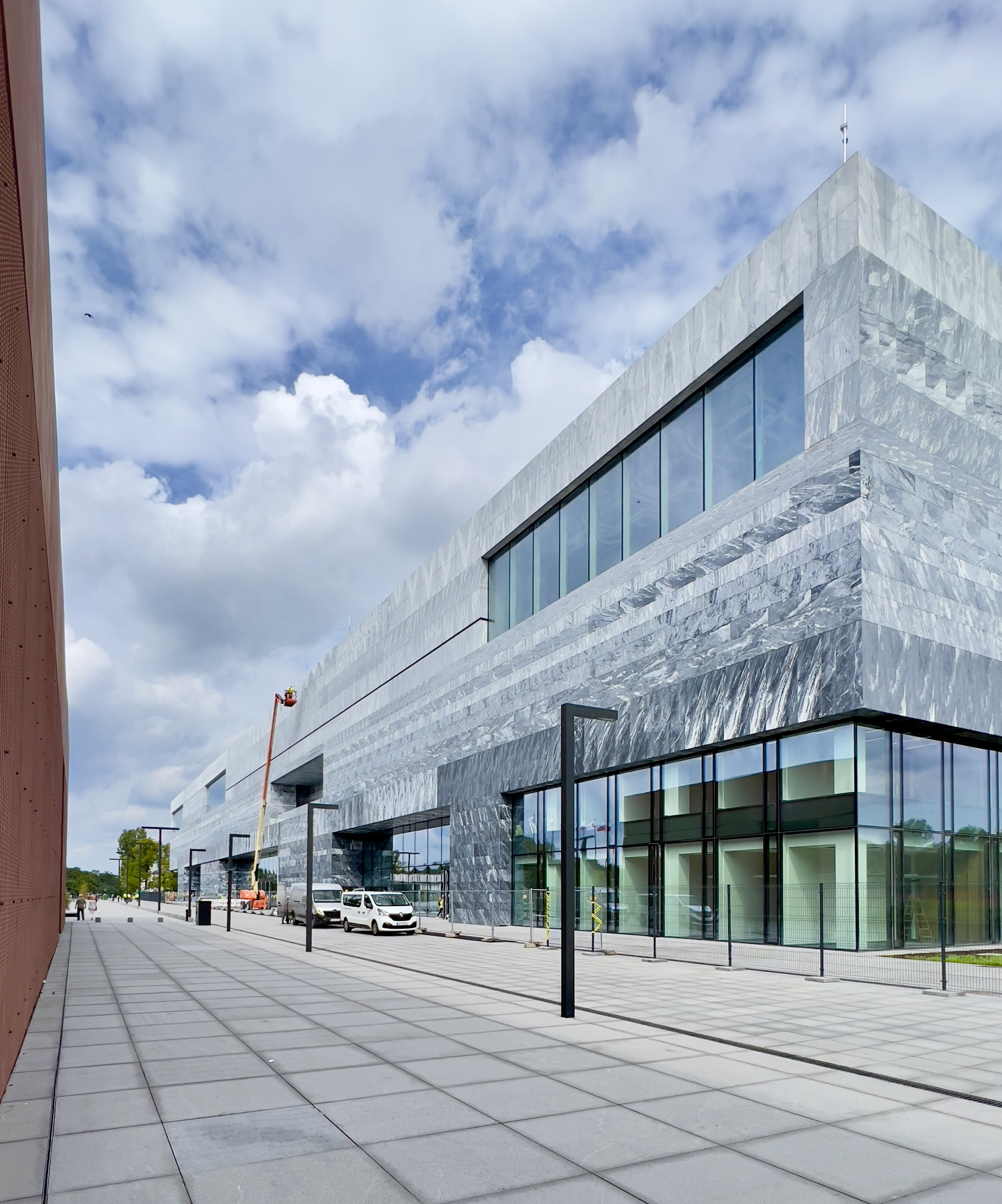
The view of the museum in 2023.

First museum's director (2006-2024) was Robert Kostro. In September 2024 Marcin Napiórkowski was appointed director. The museum council (2024-2028) includes Jolanta Choińska-Mika, Dorota Folga-Januszewska, Andrzej Friszke, Robert I. Frost, Aleksander Hall, Łukasz Kamiński, Krzysztof Mikulski, Michał Niezabitowski, Alvydas Nikžentaitis, Paweł Pietrzyk, Dariusz Stola, Tomasz Szarota, Małgorzata Zakrzewska, Marcin Zaremba.

Previous board members include Richard Butterwick-Pawlikowski, Władysław Bartoszewski, Andrzej Chojnowski, Norman Davies, Jarosław Gowin, Rafał Habielski, Wojciech Kilar, Marek Kraszewski, Janusz Kurtyka, Ryszard Legutko, Andrzej Paczkowski, Kazimierz Przybysz, Andrzej Seweryn, Wojciech Tygielski, Zofia Zielińska, Alicja Knast, Filip Musiał, Andrzej Rottermund, Paweł Śpiewak, Renata Wiśniewska, Wojciech Roszkowski, Andrzej Chwalba, Wojciech Fałkowski, Paulina Florjanowicz, Adolf Juzwenko, Zdzisław Krasnodębski, Katarzyna Mieczkowska, Andrzej Nowak, Bronisław Wildstein.

According to the museum's Web site, the permanent exhibition will be narrative in form and will use multimedia technologies to "immerse visitors in the sights, sounds and sensations typical for various eras." Until the opening of the permanent exhibition, the museum will conduct research, education, and public programs. The museum also implements international projects promoting Polish history.

Some exhibits the Museum has organized include "Dwudziestolecie. Oblicza Nowoczesności" (The 1920s: Faces of Modernity) in 2008–2009; "Wojenne Rozstania" (Wartime Separation) in 2009–2010; "Under a Common Sky: The Commonwealth of Nations, Religions, and Cultures (16th-18th century) at the Royal Castle in Warsaw in summer 2012. Additional exhibits the Museum has organized with Google Cultural Institute include "Separated by History," featuring the experiences of families separated during the years 1939-1989 and based on the museum's project of the same name, "The Solidarity and the Fall of the Iron Curtain," about the Solidarity movement and its role in the end of Communism, and "Jan Karski: Humanity's Hero," about the life and work of Jan Karski, who reported to the Polish government-in-exile and the Western Allies about the situation in German-occupied Poland during World War II.

On 11 October 2018, the construction of the new seat of the museum was officially inaugurated. The ceremony was attended by Prime Minister Mateusz Morawiecki and Minister of Culture and National Heritage Piotr Gliński. The WXCA architectural studio won the contest to design the building, which would be located in the Warsaw Citadel area. The construction of the museum took five years and in August 2023 it was finished.

In 2024, the museum was awarded the Prix Versailles, a UNESCO prize which recognizes the finest contemporary projects worldwide. The building won in the Museums category and was selected alongside six other museums around the world.

== See also ==
- Warsaw Rising Museum
- Mausoleum of Polish Rural Martyrology in Michniów
