= Warsaw Citadel =

19th-century fortress in Warsaw, Poland

- Warsaw, Poland
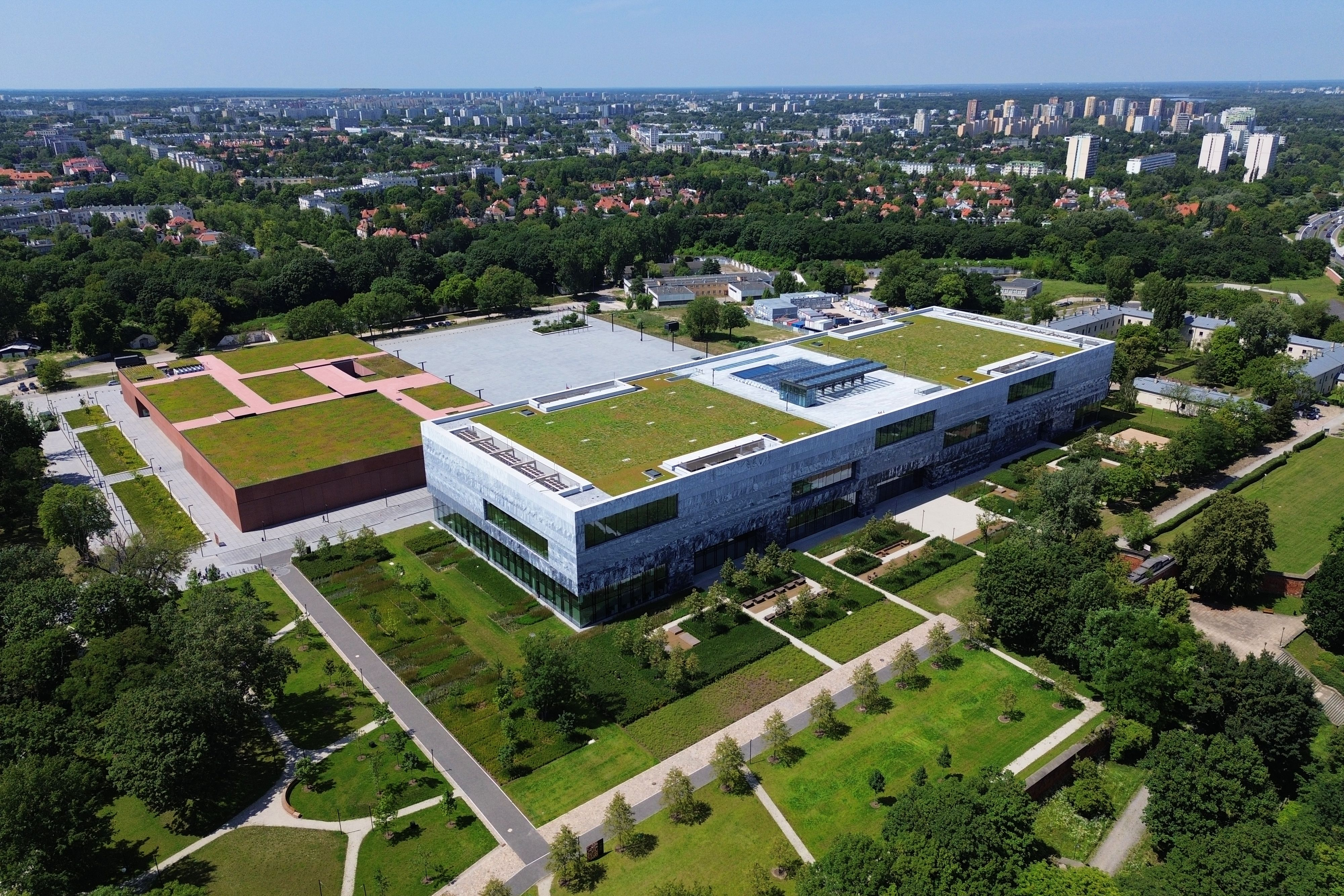
- Aerial view of Citadel in 2024 with Polish Army Museum (on the left) and Museum of Polish History.

Site information
- Type: citadel
- Controlled by: Imperial Russia (until 1918); Poland

Location
- Coordinates: 52°15′54″N 21°00′00″E

Site history
- Built: 1834

Garrison information
- Garrison: 3rd Rocket Anti-Air Artillery Brigade

Warsaw Citadel (Polish: Cytadela Warszawska) is a 19th-century fortress in Warsaw, Poland. It was built by order of Tsar Nicholas I after the suppression of the 1830 November Uprising in order to bolster imperial Russian control of the city. It served as a prison into the late 1930s, especially the dreaded Tenth Pavilion of the Warsaw Citadel (X Pawilon Cytadeli Warszawskiej); the latter has been a museum since 1963.

== History ==
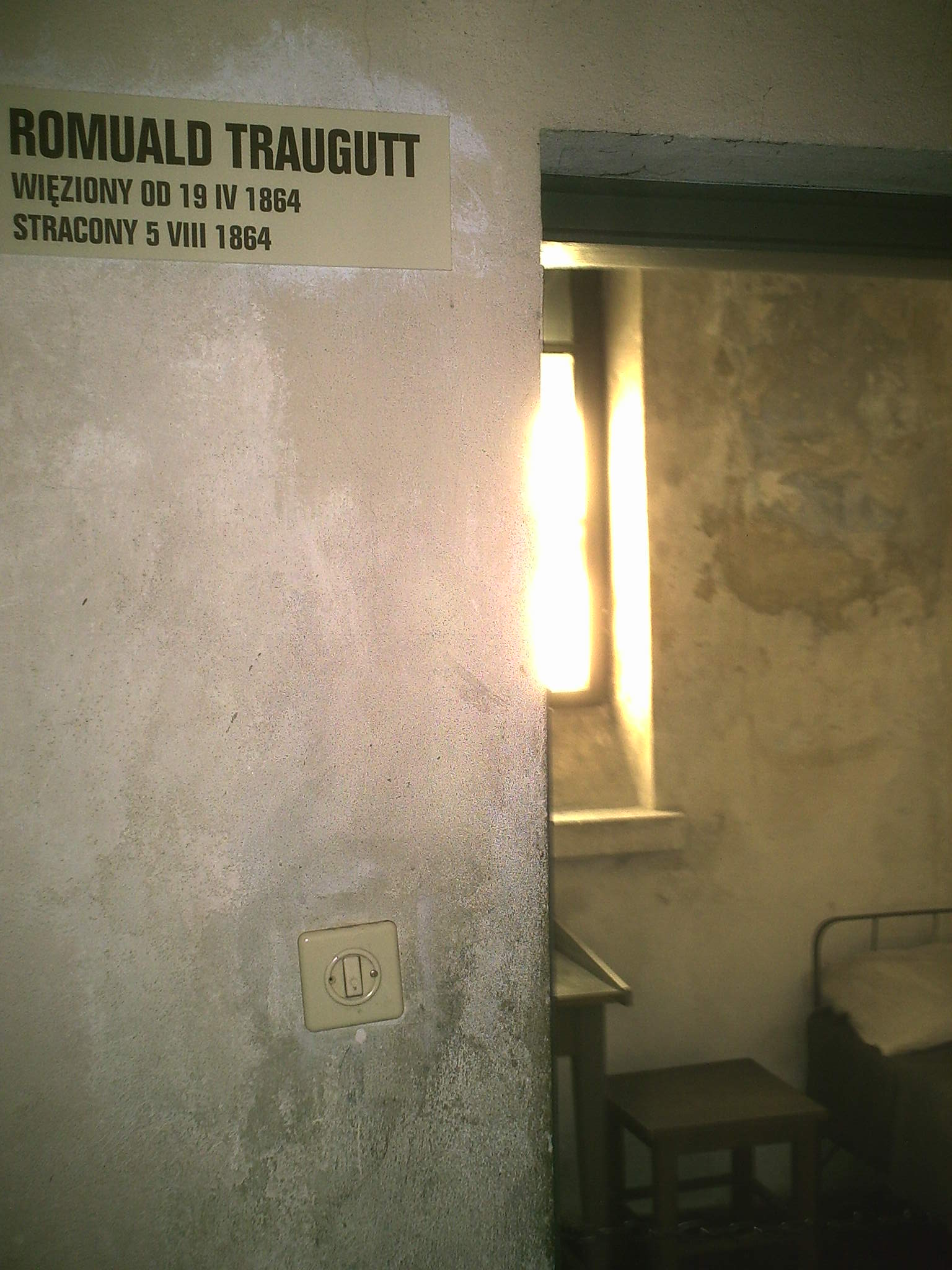
Romuald Traugutt's cell in the Tenth Pavilion

The Citadel was built by personal order of Tsar Nicholas I after the 1830 November Uprising. Its chief architect, Major General Johan Jakob von Daehn (Ivan Dehn), used the plan of the Antwerp Citadel as the basis for his own plan (the same that was demolished by the French later that year). The cornerstone was laid by Field Marshal Ivan Paskevich, de facto viceroy of Congress Poland.

In the 18th century, the Polish Army's Crown Guard barracks were located here. Their plan shaped the Citadel's interior.

The fortress is a pentagon-shaped brick structure with high outer walls, enclosing an area of 36 hectares. Its construction required the demolition of 76 residential buildings and the forcible resettlement of 15,000 inhabitants.

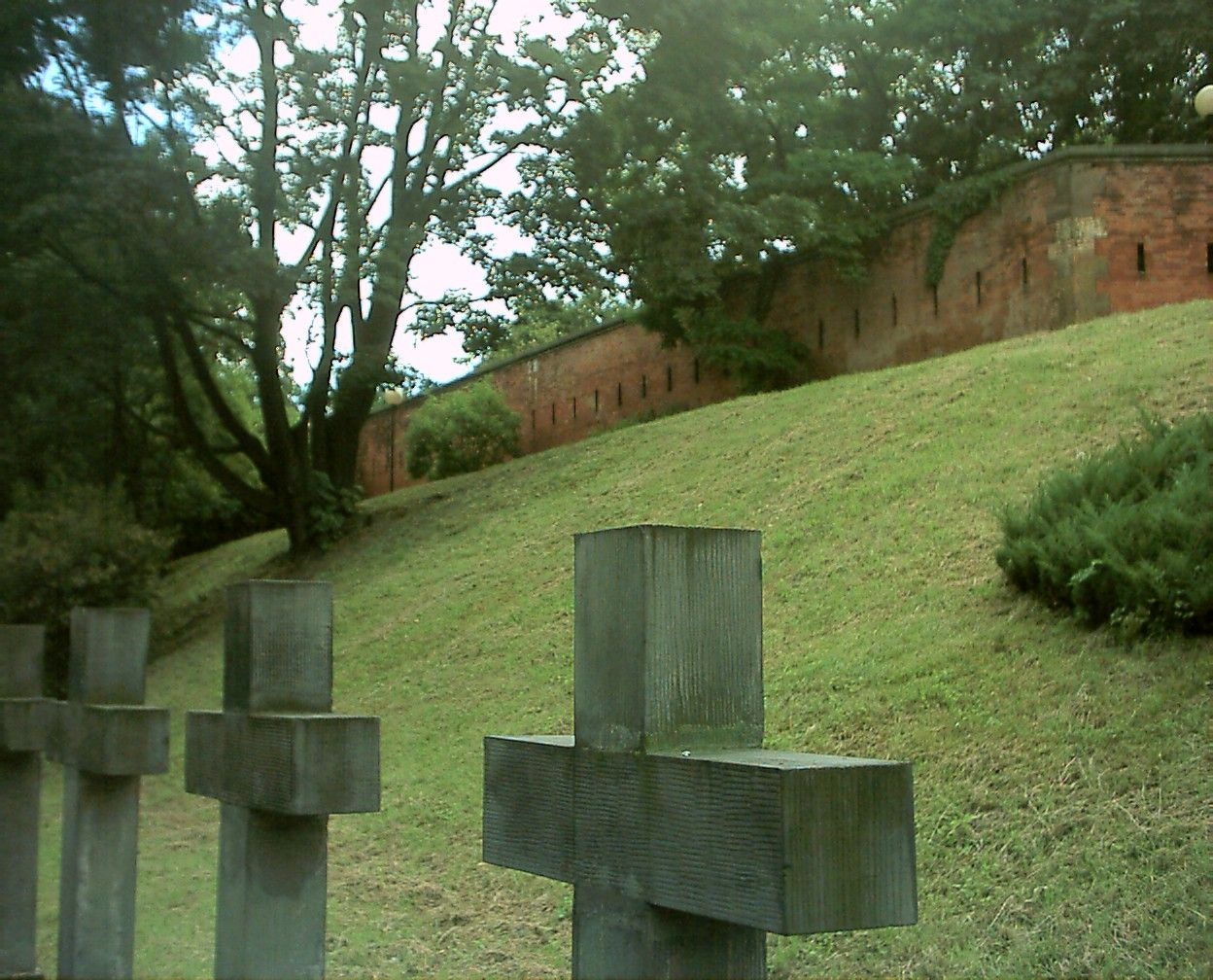
Crosses near execution site

Work on it commenced May 31, 1832, on the site of a demolished monastery and of the estate of Fawory. Officially it ended May 4, 1834, to mark the 18th birthday of Russian Crown Prince Alexander, for whom it was named. In reality, however, the fortress was not completed until 1874. The cost of construction came to 11 million rubles (roughly 8.5 tonnes of pure gold or 128 million euro at today's' prices), a colossal sum by 19th-century standards, and was borne entirely by the city of Warsaw and the Bank Polski, as yet another punishment for the failed uprising.

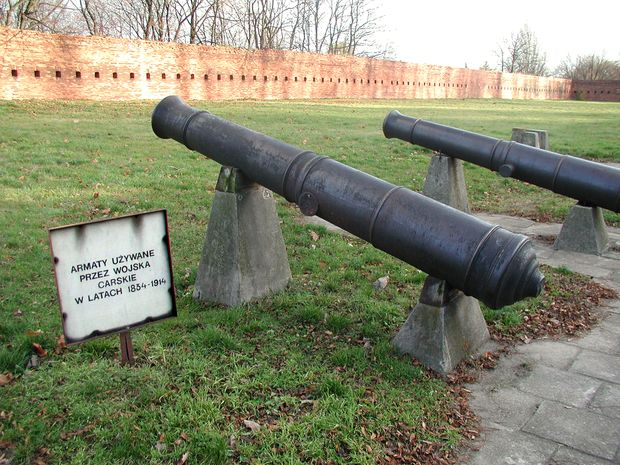
Walls and Russian artillery (view from inside)

In peacetime, some 5,000 Russian troops were stationed there. During the 1863 January Uprising, the garrison was reinforced to over 16,000. By 1863 the fortress housed 555 artillery pieces of various calibers, and could cover most of the city center with artillery fire.

About the fortress, 104 prison casemates were built, providing cells for 2,940, mostly political, prisoners. Most notably, is included the Tenth Pavilion. The list of Poles imprisoned and/or executed there up through World War I includes many notable patriots and revolutionaries: Apollo Korzeniowski, writer, political activist and father of Joseph Conrad; Romuald Traugutt, leader of the 1863 January Uprising; Jarosław Dąbrowski, later military chief of the 1871 Paris Commune; Feliks Dzierżyński, a leader of the Russian Revolution of 1917 and founder of the Cheka secret police; the Marxist theoretician and revolutionary, Róża Luksemburg; the future Marshal of Poland, Józef Piłsudski; Piłsudski's political archrival, Roman Dmowski; and Eligiusz Niewiadomski, assassin of Poland's first president, Gabriel Narutowicz. The Citadel's Tenth Pavilion has, since 1963, served as a museum.

Well before the turn of the 20th century, it was apparent that such traditional fortifications had been made obsolete by modern rifled artillery. The Tsarist authorities had planned in 1913 to raze the fortress, but the process had not begun before the outbreak of World War I. In 1915 Warsaw was occupied by German forces with little opposition from the Russian garrison, which abandoned the fortress and withdrew east. The Germans blew up several of its structures, but the main part of the Citadel remained intact and German forces performed a mass execution of 42 people in 1916.

After Poland regained her independence in 1918, the Citadel was taken over by the Polish Army. It was used as a garrison, infantry training center, and depot for materiel. During the 1944 Warsaw Uprising, the Citadel's German garrison prevented linking between the city center and the northern Żoliborz district. The fortress survived the war and in 1945 became again Polish Army property.

== See also ==
- Warsaw Fortress
- Festung Warschau
