= Ewa Milewicz =

Polish journalist

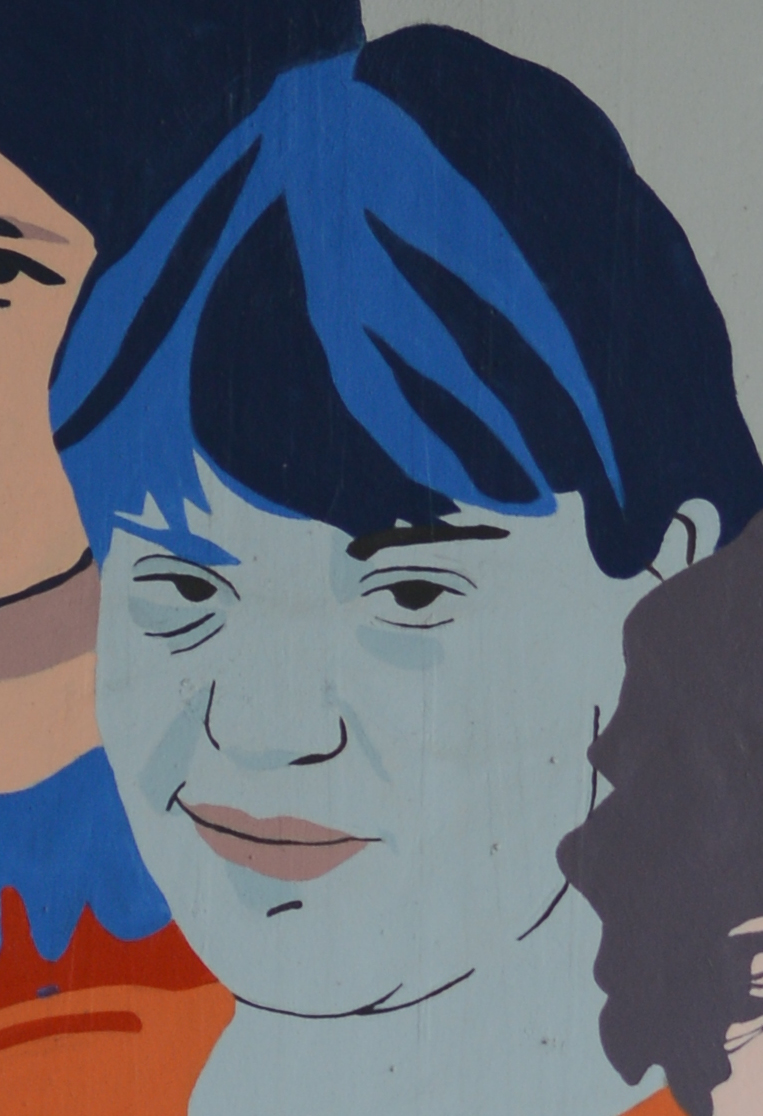

Ewa Milewicz (born in 1948) is a Polish print journalist currently working for Gazeta Wyborcza.

Milewicz holds a degree in Law from the University of Warsaw. In 1980, she was active in the Gdansk Shipyards as an organizer of the strike committee. In the same year, she joined the Committee for Social Self-defence KOR.
