= Lotnisko =

Neighbourhood in Warsaw, Poland

- City Information System area (neighbourhood)
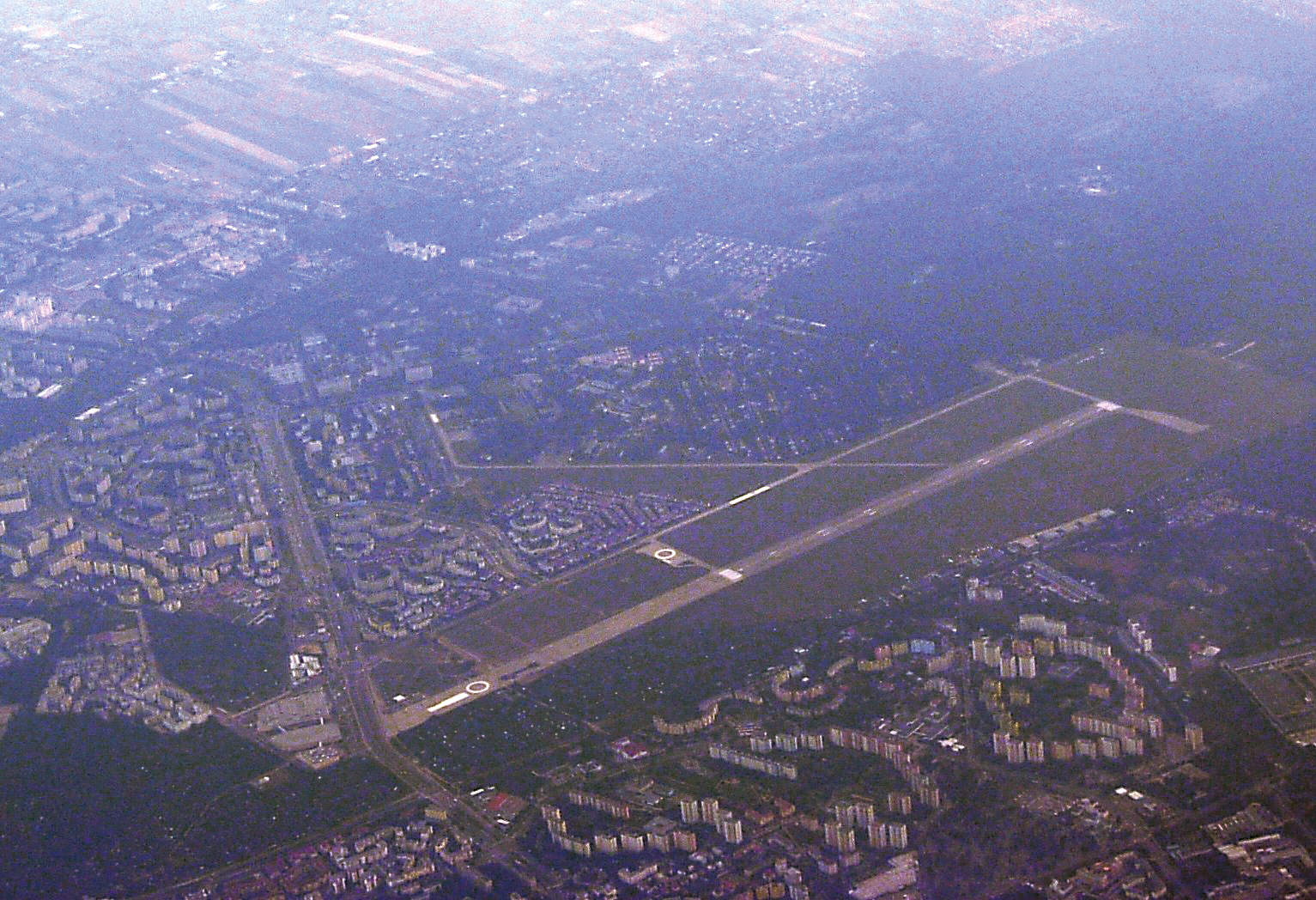
- The aerial view of the Warsaw Babice Airport in 2007.

- The location of the City Information System area of Lotnisko within the district of Bemowo
- Coordinates: 52.272608°N 20.897376°E
- Country: Poland
- Voivodeship: Masovian
- City and county: Warsaw
- District: Bemowo
- Incorporation into Warsaw: 14 May 1951

Population (2026)
  - Total: 0
- Time zone: UTC+1 (CET)
  - Summer (DST): UTC+2 (CEST)
- Area code: +48 22

Lotnisko (Polish: [lɔtˈɲis.kɔ]; lit. 'Airfield') is a neighbourhood and City Information System area in the Bemowo district of Warsaw, Poland. The majority its territory is occupied by the Warsaw Babice Airport, and the neighbourhood lacks any residential areas.

The Warsaw Babice Airport was built between 1946 and 1950. Originally used by the military, it was scaled down at the end of the 1980s, with one of its two runways being removed, and eventually opened for civilian use in 1991.

== Toponomy ==
The name Lotnisko translates in Polish to airfield, and refers to the Warsaw Babice Airport, which covers most of the neighbourhood area.

== History ==
Historically, the eastern area of the modern neighbourhood of Lotnisko was spanned by dunes, located between modern Boernerowo and Piaski. In 1655, during the Second Northern War, they were crossed by several Polish–Lithuanian infantry companies led by Janusz Radziwiłł. To commemorate the event, as the conflict was fought against Sweden, the dunes became known as the Swedish Mountains (Polish: Góry Szwedzkie).

In 1794, during the Kościuszko Uprising, the combined Prussian and Russian forces took up positions on the hills to besiege the nearby city of Warsaw, with their artillery cannons. They were attacked by Polish forces, led by Józef Poniatowski, which managed to briefly occupy the dunes, before being pushed back. They were again captured in an attack led by Jan Henryk Dąbrowski. Another skirmish took place at the Swedish Mountains in 1831 during the November Uprising, when Polish–Lithuanian insurgents, following heavy fighting, were pushed out by the Russian forces, led by Ivan Paskevich.

After 1830, the Imperial Russian Army established nearby a training area, for the soldiers of the Warsaw Citadel. It was later used by the Polish Armed Forces during the interwar period.

In 1916, a dirt runway aerodrome was built in the area, for the German Air Combat Forces. In 1919, it was adapted by the Polish government for the use of the Aviation Institute of Technology, a government research institution of aviation technologies. It operated until 1939, and its institutions were inherited in 1953 by the Air Forse Institute of Technology, with majority of its laboratories now located within the nearby neighbourhood of Fort Bema, in the complex centred around 6 Księcia Bolesława Street.

Between 1922 and 1923, several base transceiver towers of the Transatlantic Radiotelegraph Exchange, at the time one of the largest radio broadcasting stations in the world, were built in Bemowo Woods, within the eastern portion of the modern neighbourhood. During the Second World War, on 16 January 1945, they were destroyed by retreating German forces.

On 6 January 1940, while Warsaw was under the German occupation during the Second World War, the officers had executed and buried 96 people at the Swedish Mountains. It was one of the earliest mass executions committed in Poland during the conflict. The identity of the victims remains unknown. The bodies were exhumed in 1947. In 2021, the event was commemorated with a memorial placed at the corner of Krasnodębskiego and Powstańców Śląskich Streets.

On 2 August 1944, a resistance company unit of around 100 soldiers, led by Jerzy Terczyński, cryptonym Straż (Guard), was attacked by the German soldiers to the north of Boernerowo, within the area of the modern neighbourhood. The unit was retreating from Żoliborz and Bielany, while being separated and without means of communication with the rest of the insurgent forces. Polish soldiers, while in an open field, were ambushed and surrounded by German forces and shot at with machine guns. Additionally, they were shot at and rammed by a German tank. Over 70 resistance soldiers were killed, with a small number managing to escape, and a few being captured and executed afterwards. The German side suffered a few casualties and injuries.

Between 1946 and 1950, the Warsaw Babice Airport was built in the area, with two concrete crossing runways. It was the first airfield in Poland designed for the jet aircraft. It was constructed mostly with the labour of around 2,000 German prisoners of war. After 1948, they were replaced with members of the paramilitary youth organisation Service of Poland. Its location included the former aerodrome and the Swedish Mountains, which were flattened in 1949. It took on the role of numerous smaller aerodromes around the city, which were closed down following its opening. The airport was owned and used by the military. Its existence and purpose remained classified from the public until 1957. At its peak, the airport had seven hangars and three air traffic control towers. On 24 July 1956, the Tupolev Tu-104 landed on the airfield, becoming the first civilian jet aircraft in the country. On 19 October 1956, Nikita Khrushchev, the General Secretary of the Communist Party of the Soviet Union, arrived at the airport during his visit to Poland. It was connected with the appointment of Władysław Gomułka as the First Secretary of the Polish United Workers' Party, and the following political crisis between both countries. In the following years, the airport was also visited by Richard Nixon, the Vice President of the United States, in 1972, and Charles de Gaulle, the President of France, in 1967.

Throughout the 1970s and the 1980s, the area around the airport was developed with housing estates of apartment buildings. As such, at the end of the 1980s, it was decided to scale down the airfield. Its eastern runway and portion of the hangars were removed and sold for the housing development. The runway and several taxiways in the area, were redeveloped into roads, with the main one becoming the extension of Powstańców Śląskich Street. The airport was mostly demilitarised in 1991, and given for the use of the Polish Medical Air Rescue, Warsaw Aeroclub, and several training organisations. On 20 September 1996, it hosted a concert by Michael Jackson, during his HIStory World Tour, with 120,000 attendees. Since then, it has hosted numerous other concerts, including by Madonna (2009), AC/DC (2010), Iron Maiden (2011), and Metallica (2012).

On 14 May 1951, the area was incorporated into the city of Warsaw, becoming part of the Wola district. On 29 December 1989, following an administrative reform in the city, it became part of the municipality of Warsaw-Wola, and on 25 March 1994, of the municipality of Warsaw-Bemowo, which, on 27 October 2002, was restructured into the city district of Bemowo. In 1997, it was subdivided into ten areas of the City Information System, with Lotnisko becoming one of them.

== Characteristics ==
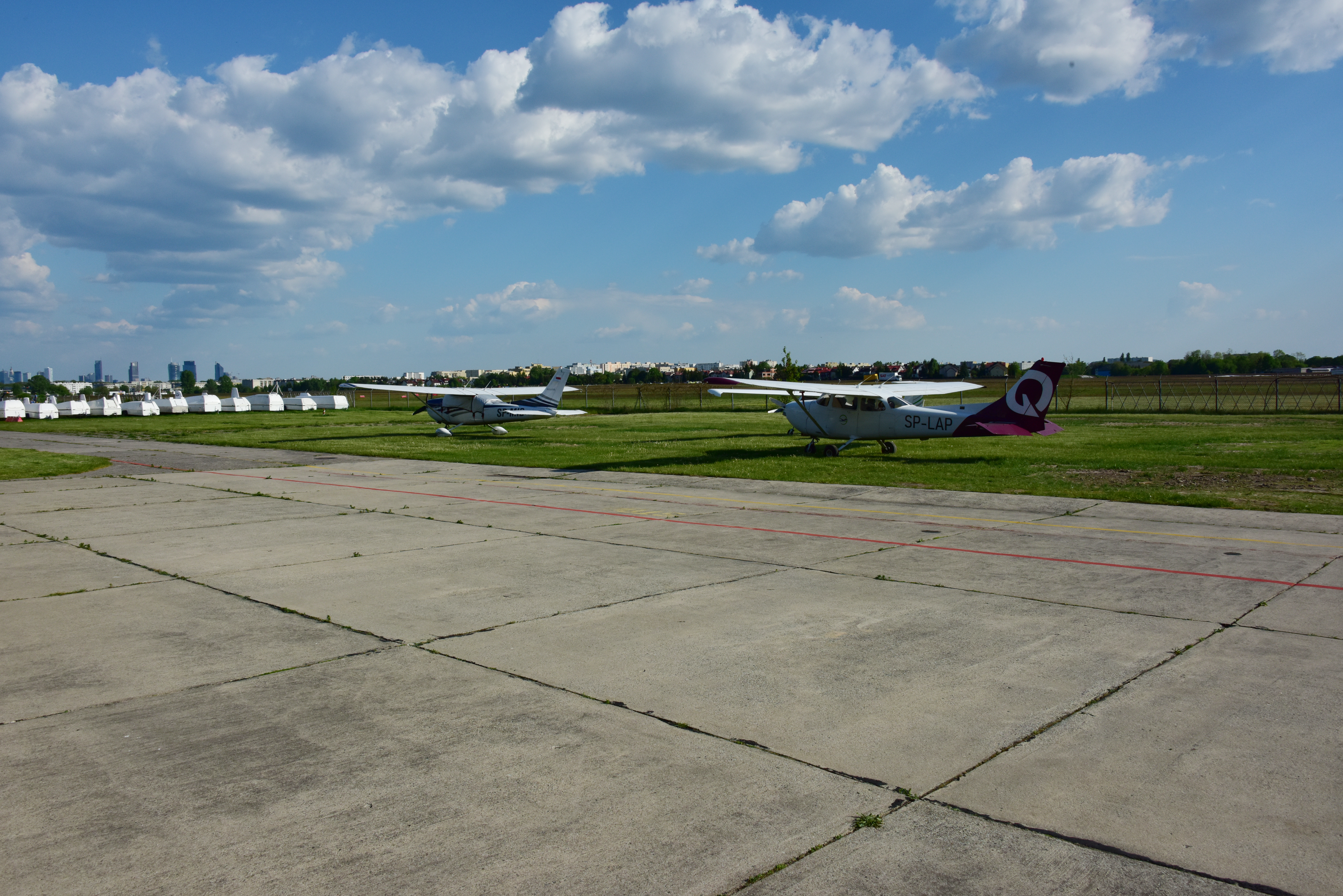
A taxiway at the Warsaw Babice Airport.

The majority of the neighbourhood area is occupied by Warsaw Babice Airport, with its concrete runway. It is mainly used by the Polish Medical Air Rescue, Warsaw Aeroclub, and several training organisations. A small portion of the eastern side of the neighbourhood is covered by a part of the Bemowo Woods. The area includes several ruins of the former Transatlantic Radiotelegraph Exchange, dating to the 1920s, in form of the foundations leftover after the radio broadcasting masts, and abandoned guard outposts. The neighborhood lacks any residential areas.

== Boundaries ==
Lotnisko is a City Information System area, located in the northwestern portion of the district of Bemowo. Its boundaries are approximately determined by Kampinoska Street, and Księżycowa Street to the north, Powstańców Śląskich Street to the east, Piastów Śląskich Street, Radiowa Street, and around the neighbourhood of Boernerowo to the south, and the city border to the west.

The neighbourhood borders Chomiczówka, and Radiowo to the north, Piaski to the northeast, Fort Bema to the east, Bemowo-Lotnisko, Boernerowo, and Fort Radiowo to the south, and the municipality of Stare Babice to the west. It western boundary marks the district border with Bielany to the north, and Warsaw West County to the west.
