= Fort Radiowo =

Neighbourhood in Warsaw, Poland

- City Information System area (neighbourhood)
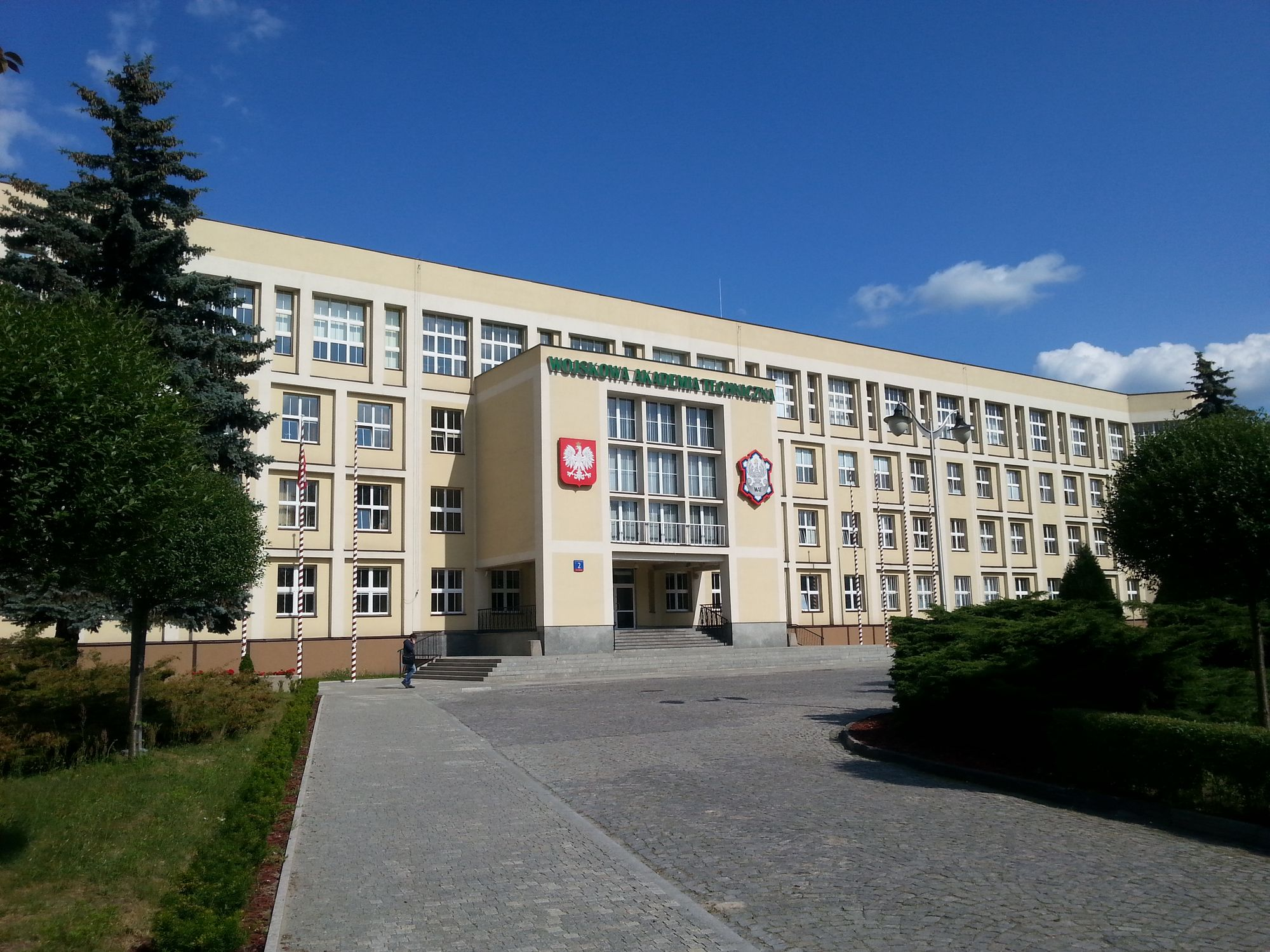
- The main building of the Military University of Technology in Fort Radiowo, in 2015.

- The location of the City Information System area of Fort Radiowo within the district of Bemowo
- Coordinates: 52.255430°N 20.888057°E
- Country: Poland
- Voivodeship: Masovian
- City and county: Warsaw
- District: Bemowo
- Incorporation into Warsaw: 14 May 1951
- Time zone: UTC+1 (CET)
  - Summer (DST): UTC+2 (CEST)
- Area code: +48 22

Fort Radiowo (Polish: [ˈfɔrt raˈdjɔ.vɔ]) is a neighbourhood and City Information System area in the Bemowo district of Warsaw, Poland. It features the campus of the Military University of Technology and low-rise single-family housing, as well as the historic Fort IIA, dating to the 1880s.

In the 1880s, the Fort IIA Babice (later also known as Radiowo), was built in the area of the modern neighbourhood, as part of the fortifications of Warsaw. In 1923, it was adopted to house the broadcasting infrastructure of the Transatlantic Radiotelegraph Exchange, at the time, one of the largest radio communication stations in the world. In 1933, a small suburb of Boernerowo was built nearby to house its employees. The complex was destroyed in 1944 during the Second World War. In 1951, the campus of the Military University of Technology was built in the area. It was incorporated into the city the same year.

== Toponomy ==
The neighbourhood is named after the Fort IIA, commonly known as Fort Radiowo. Its name, loosely translating to Fort Radioville, came from housing the broadcasting infrastructure of the Transatlantic Radiotelegraph Exchange from 1923 to 1944, which, at the time, was one of the largest radio communication stations in the world.

== History ==
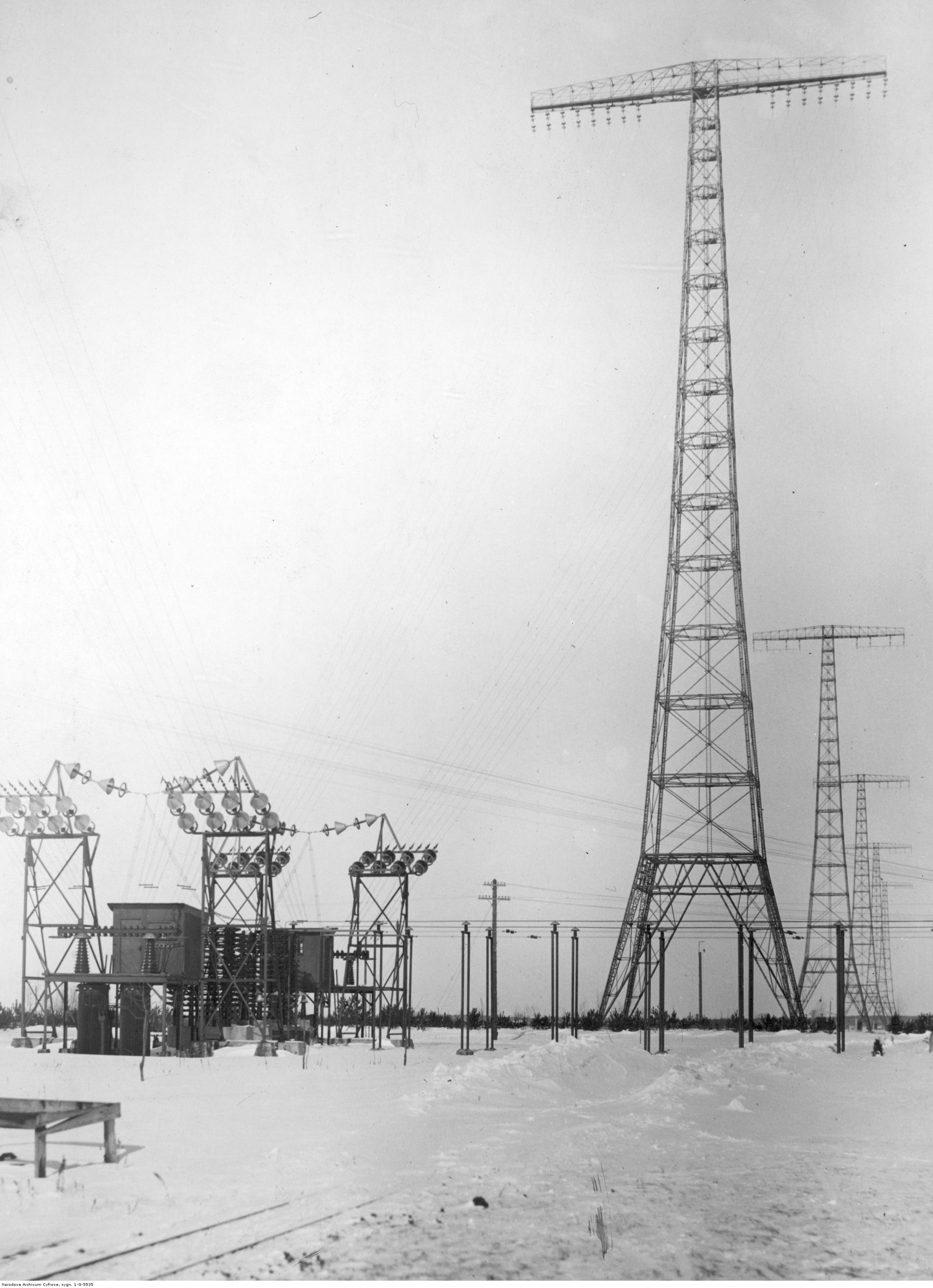
One of the radio masts of the Transatlantic Radiotelegraph Exchange, sometime before 1939.

In the 1880s, the Fort IIA Babice (later also known as Radiowo), was built near the current corner Leskiego and Radiowa Streets. It was part of the series of fortifications of the Warsaw Fortress, built around the city by the Imperial Russian Army. It was decommissioned in 1913.

In 1923, the fort was adopted to house the broadcasting infrastructure of the Transatlantic Radiotelegraph Exchange, at the time, one of the largest radio communication stations in the world. The complex included ten 127-metre-tall (416.7 ft) steel radio masts, placed in the nearby Bemowo Woods, in an area spaning 4 km (2.5 miles). They were operated with the 200 kW Alexanderson alternators powered by a 500 kW Diesel engine, providing stable connections and large range, which allowed for worldwide communications, conducted with the Morse code. In 1926, the complex was connected to the power plant in Pruszków, and in 1938, two more radio masts were added. The Transatlantic Radiotelegraph Exchange also had its receiver infrastructure in Grodzisk Mazowiecki, and the Central Operations Office in Warsaw.

In 1933, a small suburb of Boernerowo, originally known as Osiedle Łączności, was developed nearby, to the northeast, to provide housing for the employees of the Transatlantic Radiotelegraph Exchange. By 1939, it had 275 houses and a population of around 1,500 people. In 1933, it was also connected to Ulrychów via a tram line, which crossed area near the Fort IIA. In 1933, the area became part of the village assembly (gromada) with the seat in Osiedle Łączności, founded as a subdivision of the municipality of Młociny. On 1 January 1936, it was transferred to the municipality of Blizne, and on 27 April, Osiedle Łączności was put under the jurisdiction of the village assembly of Radiostacja.

In September 1939, during the siege of Warsaw in the Second World War, the Fort IIA, and the nearby Boernerowo, were defended by the 3rd Battalion of the 26 Infantry Regiment of the 5th Infantry Division of the Polish Land Forces, commanded by major Jacek Decowski. On 16 September, the 3rd Battalion, together with the 3rd battery of the 54th Artillery Regiment, moved to the Fort IIA, which they defended from heavy attacks on 17 and 18 September. The next they, the battalion attacked the village of Janów, while German forces began an attack on Boernerowo coming from Stare Babice. From 23 to 24 September, German artillery fired towards Boernerowo. On 27 September, German forces captured the Fort II in Wawrzyszew, exposing Polish positions, and surrounding the 3rd Battalion from the north, capturing the Swedish Hills. On the same day, the 19th Infantry Division of Wehrmacht captured Boernerowo and the Transatlantic Radiotelegraph Exchange, following the heavy fighting. The battalion suffered devastating losses, with the remaining survivors being captured. Overall, around 85 to 90% of the soldiers of the 3rd Battalion were killed during the siege of Warsaw. During the occupation of the city, German forces used the broadcasting station to communicate with the crews of their U-boat submarines. The entire radio broadcasting infrastructure was destroyed on 16 January 1945, by German forces retreating from the advancing Red Army. In 1951, the campus complex of the Military University of Technology was opened between Radiowa, Powstańców Śląskich, Dywizjonu 303, Kocjana, and Kartezjusza Streets, with its main building being placed on 2 Kaliskiego Street. In 1950, the former tram line to Boernerowo, closed in 1944, was replaced with new tracks, crossing the campus along Dywizjonu 303 and Kaliskiego Streets.

On 14 May 1951, the area was incorporated into the city of Warsaw, becoming part of the Wola district. On 29 December 1989, following an administrative reform in the city, it became part of the municipality of Warsaw-Wola, and on 25 March 1994, of the municipality of Warsaw-Bemowo, which, on 27 October 2002, was restructured into the city district of Bemowo. In 1997, it was subdivided into ten areas of the City Information System, with Fort Radiowo becoming one of them.

In 1976, the Institute of Plasma Physics and Laser Microfusion, a government research organisation studying plazma, was opened with its facility located at 23 Hery Street, within the campus of the Military University of Technology.

== Characteristics ==
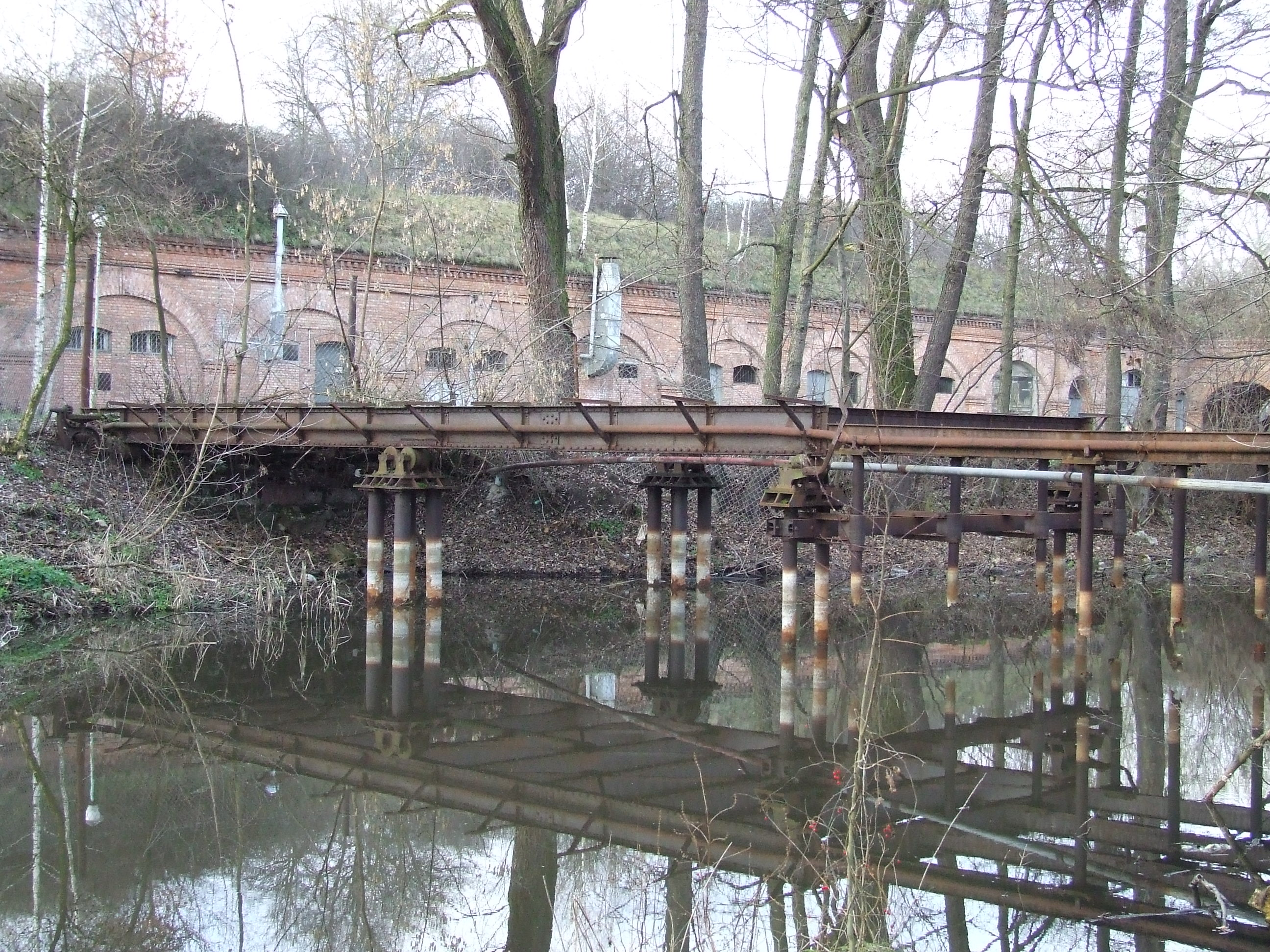
The Fort IIA Radiowo.

The majority of the eastern side of the neighbourhood area is occupied by the campus of the Military University of Technology, located between Radiowa, Powstańców Śląskich, Dywizjonu 303, Kocjana, and Kartezjusza Streets, and with its main building being placed at 2 Kaliskiego Street. It also includes the Institute of Plasma Physics and Laser Microfusion, a government research organisation studying plazma, at 23 Hery Street. Additionally, the campus is crossed by a tram line, along Dywizjonu 303 and Kaliskiego Streets, forming connection between Boernerowo and Wola. Fort Radiowo also includes residential areas, mostly with low-rise single-family housing. In the west, it is mostly covered by the Bemowo Woods. It also includes the Fort IIA Radiowo (also known as Babice), a historic and decommissioned fortification built in the 1880s, placed at the corner of Leskiego and Radiowa Streets. Several ruins of the former Transatlantic Radiotelegraph Exchange from the 1920s, are also present in the area, mainly foundations leftover after the radio broadcasting masts, and abandoned guard outposts.

== Boundaries ==
Fort Radiowo is a City Information System area, located in the central western portion of the district of Bemowo. Its boundaries are approximately determined by Radiowa Street to the north, Powstańców Śląskich Street to the east, Dywizjonu 303 Street, Lazurowa Street, and Kocjana Street to the south, and the city boundaries to the west, marked on the line of the former radio broadcasting masts of the Transatlantic Radiotelegraph Exchange.

The neighbourhood borders Lotnisko, and Boernerowo to the north, Bemowo-Lotnisko to the northeast, Górce, and Groty to the south, and the municipality of Stare Babice to the west. Its western boundary marks the city border with the Warsaw West County.
