= Bemowo-Lotnisko =

Neighbourhood in Warsaw, Poland

- City Information System area (neighbourhood)
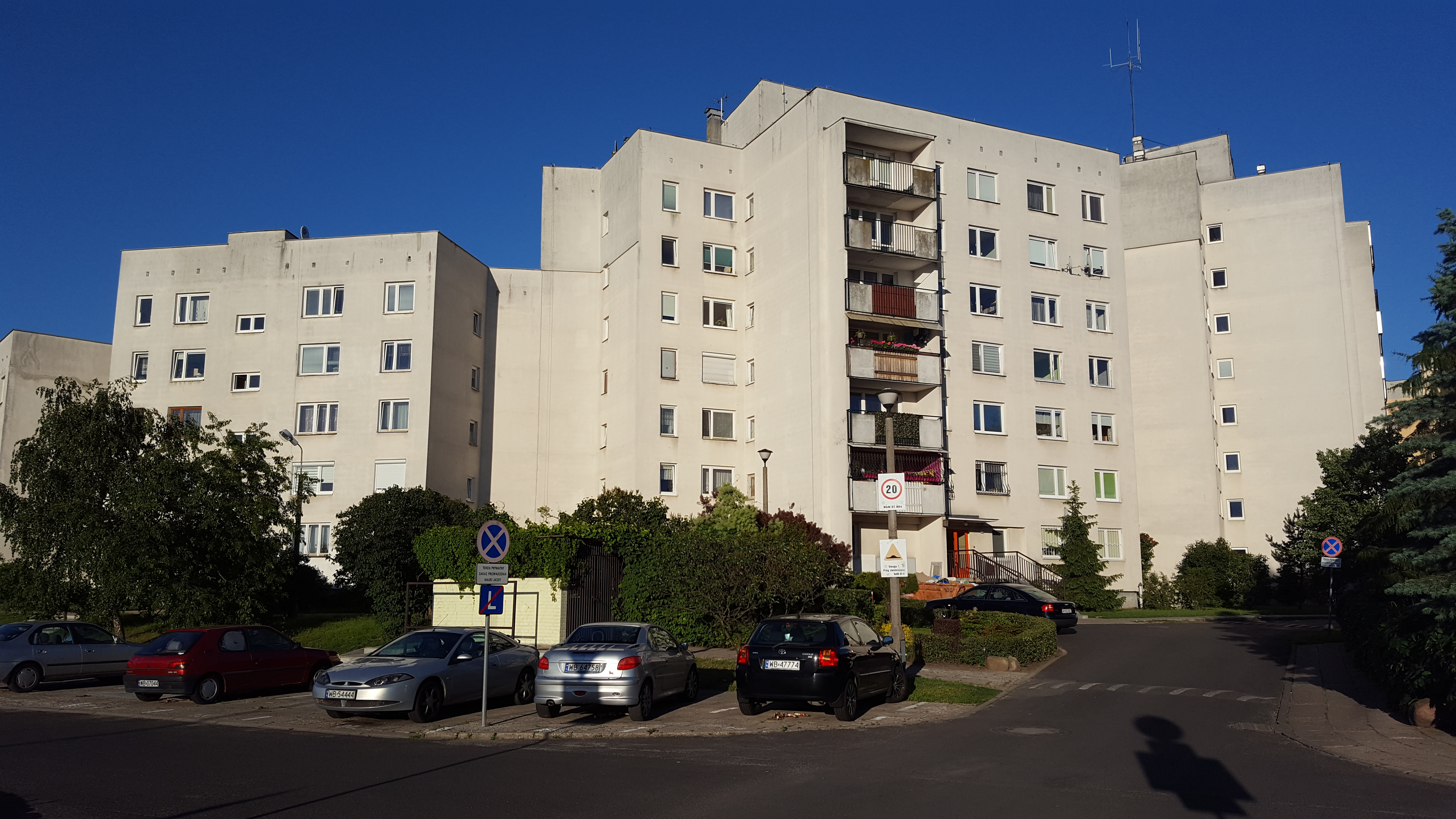
- The apartment buildings at Millera Street in 2016.

- The location of the City Information System area of Bemowo-Lotnisko within the district of Bemowo
- Coordinates: 52.257038°N 20.915674°E
- Country: Poland
- Voivodeship: Masovian
- City and county: Warsaw
- District: Bemowo
- Incorporation into Warsaw: 14 May 1951
- Time zone: UTC+1 (CET)
  - Summer (DST): UTC+2 (CEST)
- Area code: +48 22

Bemowo-Lotnisko (Polish: [bɛˈmɔ.vɔ lɔtˈɲis.kɔ]; lit. 'Bemowo-Airfield'), also known as Nowe Bemowo ([ˈnɔ.vɛ bɛˈmɔ.vɔ]; lit. 'New Bemowo'), is a neighbourhood and City Information System area in the Bemowo district of Warsaw, Poland. It is a residential area dominated by mid- and high-rise housing estates with apartment buildings. It also features a portion of the Warsaw Babice Airport, with several hangars and taxiways.

The Warsaw Babice Airport was built in the area between 1946 and 1950. Originally used by the military, it was scaled down at the end of the 1980s, with one of its two runways being removed, and eventually opened for civilian use in 1991. Throughout the 1980s, several housing estates with apartment buildings, were developed within the neighbourhood.

== Toponomy ==
The name Bemowo-Lotnisko is formed from two parts. Bemowo refers to the city district of Bemowo, which includes the neighbourhood. It was named as such in 1998, after the nearby Bem Fort, a 19th-century fortification, which itself was named in honour of Józef Bem, an 18th- and 19th-century engineer and military officer, and veteran of the November Uprising. Previously, from 1947 to 1987, it was used as the name of the nearby neighbourhood, now known as Boernerowo. In 1997, the district was subdivided into ten areas of the City Information System, a municipal standardised street signage system, with Bemowo-Lotnisko becoming one of them. Lotnisko translates in Polish to airfield, and refers to the Warsaw Babice Airport, which used to cover the eastern half of the modern neighbourhood, before being scaled down at the end of the 1980s. It is also alternatively known as Nowe Bemowo, meaning New Bemowo.

== History ==
After 1830, the Imperial Russian Army established training area, for the soldiers of the Warsaw Citadel, located in the northern portion of the current neighbourhood. It was later used by the Polish Armed Forces during the interwar period.

In 1950, a tram line was built, connecting Boernerowo with Koło and Ulrychów, partially crossing the northern current boundaries of Bemowo-Lotnisko, via Dywizjonu 303 Street.

On 14 May 1951, the area was incorporated into the city of Warsaw, becoming part of the Wola district. On 29 December 1989, following an administrative reform in the city, it became part of the municipality of Warsaw-Wola, and on 25 March 1994, of the municipality of Warsaw-Bemowo, which, on 27 October 2002, was restructured into the city district of Bemowo. In 1997, it was subdivided into ten areas of the City Information System, with Bemowo-Lotnisko becoming one of them.

Between 1946 and 1950, the Warsaw Babice Airport was built in the area, with two concrete crossing runways. It was the first airfield in Poland designed for the jet aircraft. It was constructed mostly with the labour of around 2,000 German prisoners of war. After 1948, they were replaced with members of the paramilitary youth organisation Service of Poland. Its location included the former aerodrome and the Swedish Mountains, which were flattened in 1949. It took on the role of numerous smaller aerodromes around the city, which were closed down following its opening. The airport was owned and used by the military. Its existence and purpose remained classified from the public until 1957. At its peak, the airport had seven hangars and three air traffic control towers. On 24 July 1956, the Tupolev Tu-104 landed on the airfield, becoming the first civilian jet aircraft in the country. On 19 October 1956, Nikita Khrushchev, the General Secretary of the Communist Party of the Soviet Union, arrived at the airport during his visit to Poland. It was connected with the appointment of Władysław Gomułka as the First Secretary of the Polish United Workers' Party, and the following political crisis between both countries. In the following years, the airport was also visited by Richard Nixon, the Vice President of the United States, in 1972, and Charles de Gaulle, the President of France, in 1967.

Throughout the 1980s, the area to the east of the airport with housing estates of apartment buildings. As such, at the end of the 1980s, it was decided to scale down the airfield. Its eastern runway and portion of the hangars were removed and sold for the housing development. The runway and several taxiways in the area, were redeveloped into roads, with the main one becoming the extension of Powstańców Śląskich Street. The airport was mostly demilitarised in 1991, and given for the use of the Polish Medical Air Rescue, Warsaw Aeroclub, and several training organisations. Currently, the neighbourhood still features several artefacts left behind by the airfield, such as the abandoned air traffic control tower, near the corner of Wiadowska and Osmańczyka Streets. Since 2017, it is listed on the municipal heritage list.

In total, by the end of the 1980s, in the area of Powstańców Śląskich and Radiowa Streets, were developed five housing estates of apartment buildings. In 1997, a tram tracks were built along Powstańców Śląskich Street and Radiowa, forming connections with lines on Górczewska and Dywizjonu 303 Streets. In 2015, it was expanded further north, connecting to line at Broniewskiego Street in Bielany.

== Overview ==
Bemowo-Lotnisko is a residential area dominated by mid- and high-rise housing with the apartment buildings. It has a tram line along Powstańców Śląskich Street. It also features a portion of the Warsaw Babice Airport, with hangars and taxiways. The neighbourhood also features several artefacts left behind by the airfield's former east runway, including Powstańców Śląskich Street built in its place, as well as several other roads replacing former taxiways. Just outside its boundaries, within the neighbourhood of Fort Bema, is also present an abandoned air traffic control tower, near the corner of Wiadowska and Osmańczyka Streets, listed on the municipal heritage list. There are also several former hangars present in the area.

== Boundaries ==
Bemowo-Lotnisko is a City Information System area, located in the central north portion of the district of Bemowo. Its boundaries are approximately determined by Piastów Street to the north; around the eastern boundtry of the housing estate of Bemowo V to the east, Bohaterów Bitry Warszawskiej 1920 roku Avenue, and Dywizjonu 303 Street to the south; and Powstańców Śląskich Street, Radiowa Street, Dostępna Street, and around the Warsaw Babice Airport to the west. The neighbourhood borders Lotnisko to the north, Fort Bema to the east, Górce to the south, and Boernerowo, and Fort Radiowo to the west.
