= Józef Bem Memorial (Bemowo) =

Monument in Warsaw, Poland

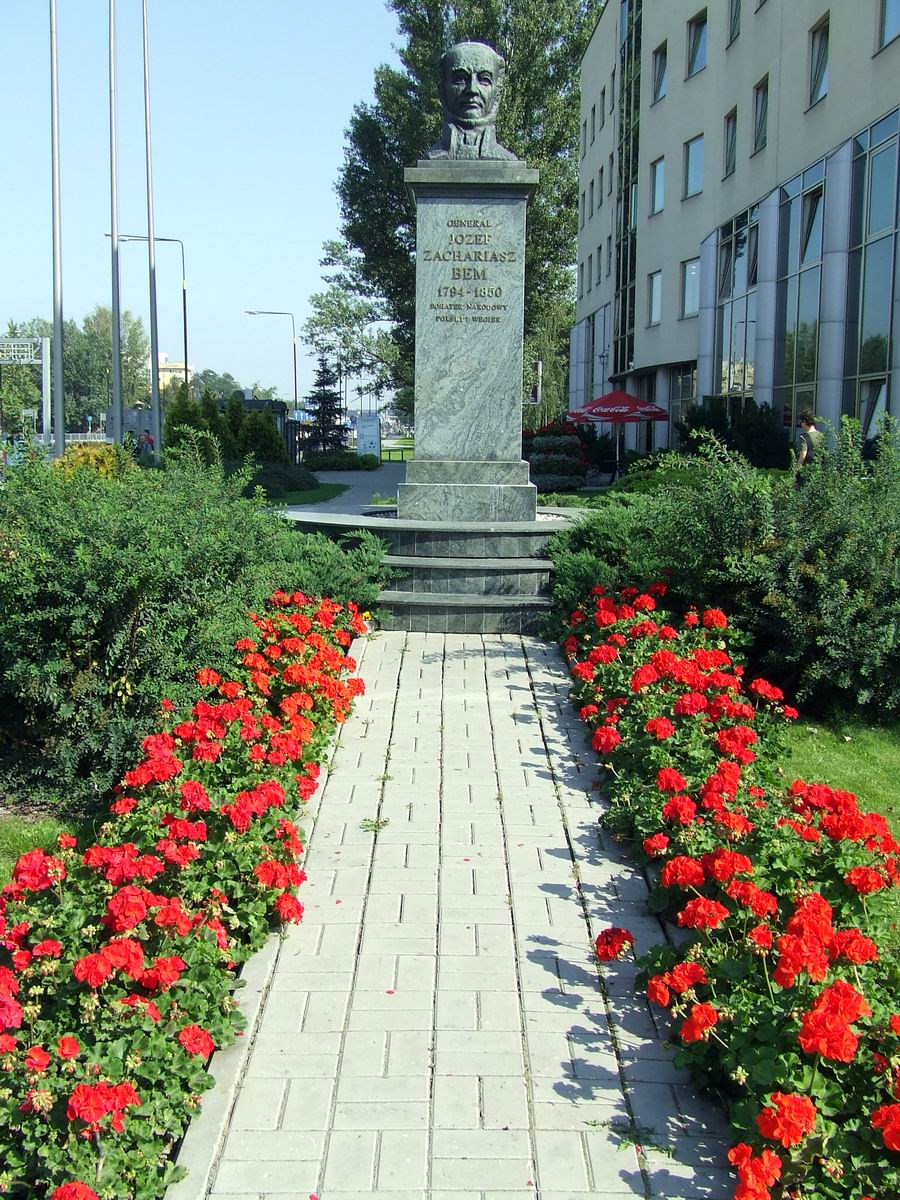
- The monument in 2006.
- Interactive map of Józef Bem Memorial
- Location: 70 Powstańców Śląskich Street, Bemowo, Warsaw, Poland
- Coordinates: 52.238898°N 20.913855°E
- Designer: Ferdynand Jarocha
- Type: Bust on pedestal
- Material: Bronze
- Completion date: 1996 (bust sculpture)
- Opening date: 2003

The Józef Bem Memorial (Polish: Pomnik Józefa Bema) is a monument in Warsaw, Poland, within the Bemowo district, placed in front of its town hall, at 70 Powstańców Śląskich 70, and at the corner with Górczewska Street. It is dedicated to Józef Bem, an 18th- and 19th-century engineer and military officer, and veteran of the November Uprising, who is the namesake of the city district. The monument consists of his bronze bust sculpture, placed on a tall pedestal The bust was sculptured by Ferdynand Jarocha in 1996, and the monument was unveiled in front of the town hall in 2003.

== History ==
The bust depicting Józef Bem, an 18th- and 19th-century engineer and military officer, and veteran of the November Uprising, was sculptured in 1996 by Ferdynand Jarocha. In 2003, it was unveiled in front of the Bemowo Town Hall, in form of a monument placed on a tall pedestal.

== Overview ==
The monument consists of a bronze bust sculpture depicting Józef Bem, placed on top of a tall pedestal with a square base. It features the following Polish inspiration:

Polish inscription

Generał
Józef
Zachariasz
Bem
1794–1850
Bohater narodowy
Polski i Węgier

Translation:
English translation

General
Józef
Zachariasz
Bem
1794–1850
The national hero of
Poland and Hungary

It is placed in front of the Bemowo Town Hall at 70 Powstańców Śląskich Street, and at the corner with Górczewska Street. Bem is the district's namesake.
