= Bemowo =

City district of Warsaw, Poland

- City district
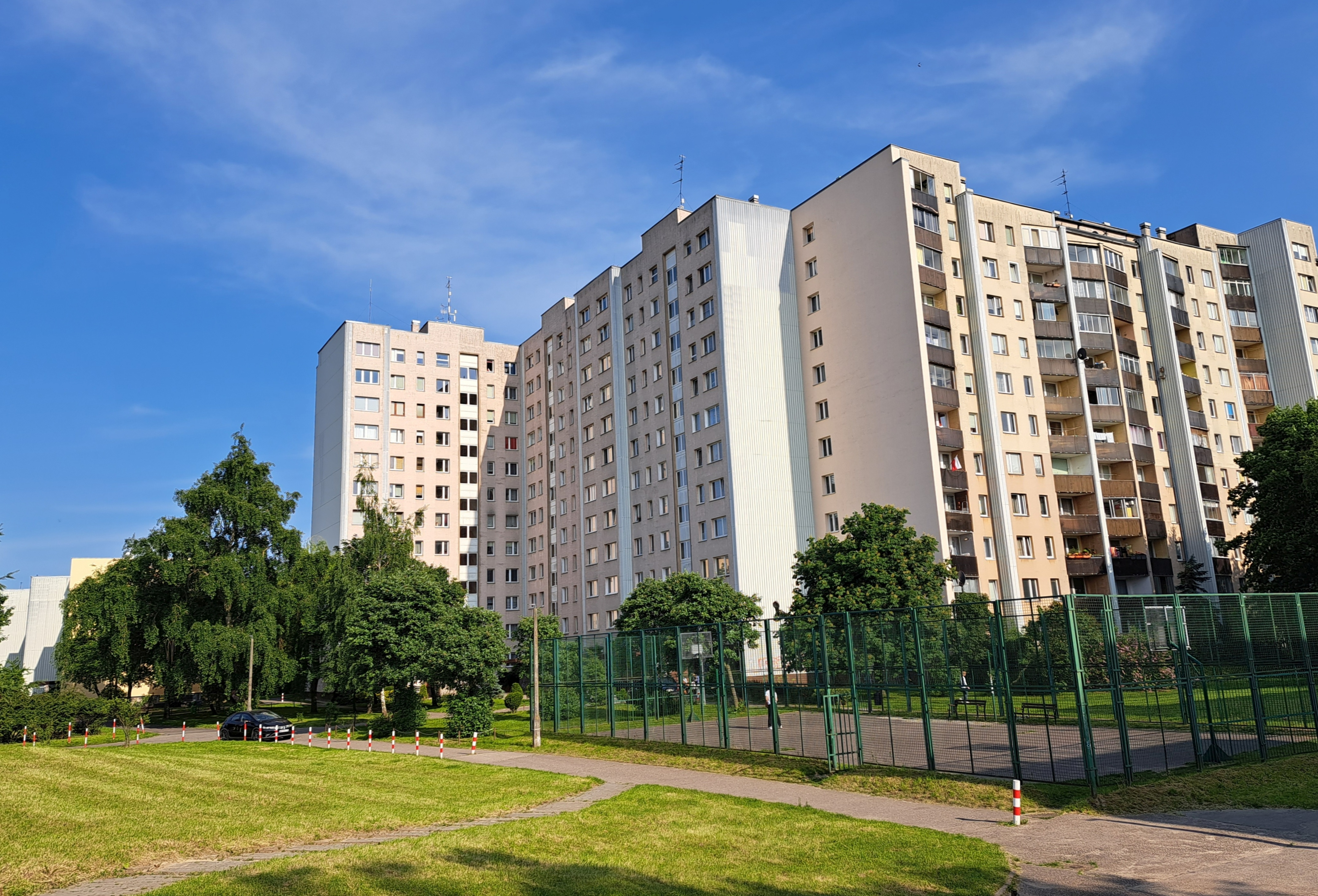
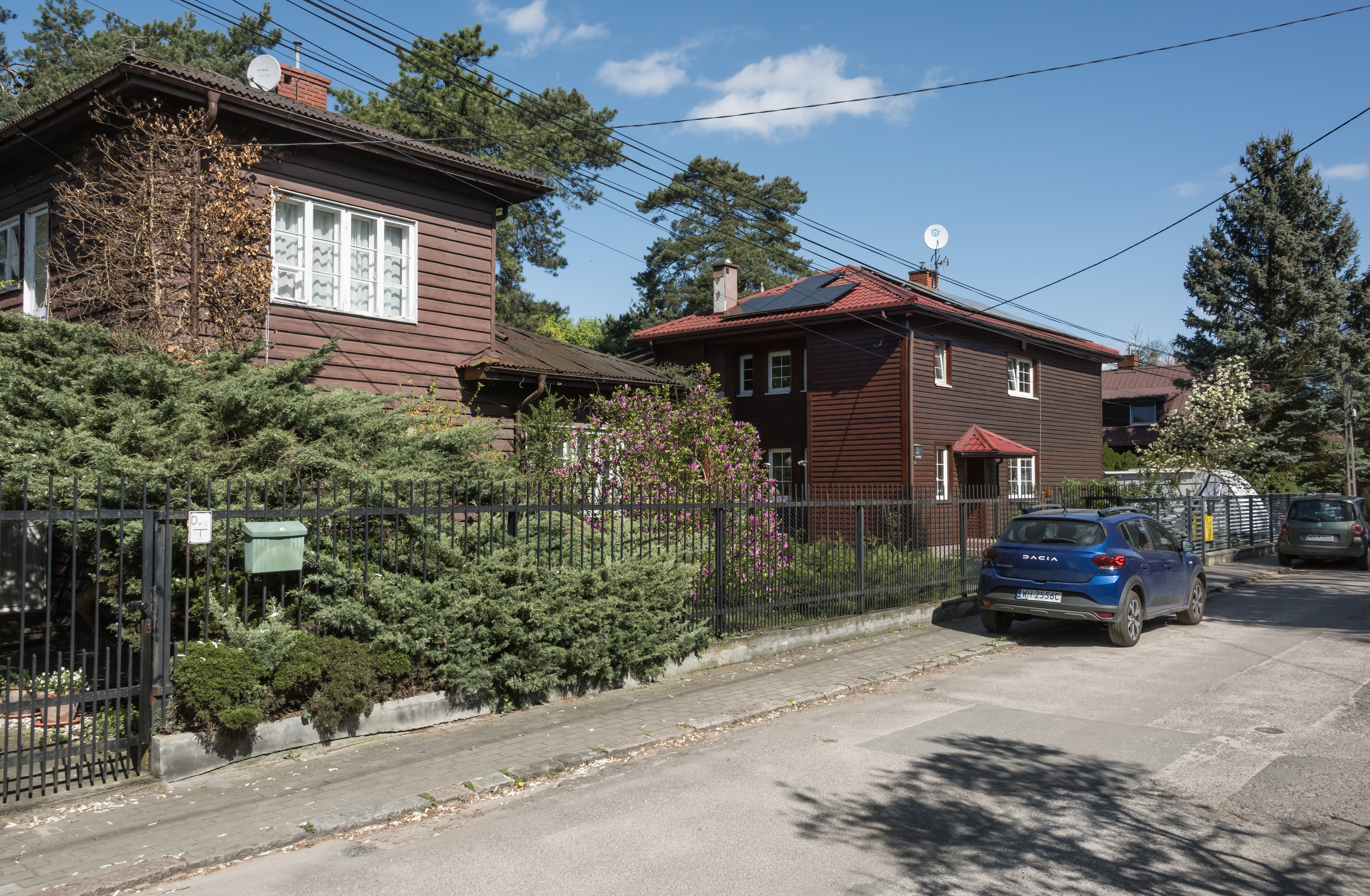
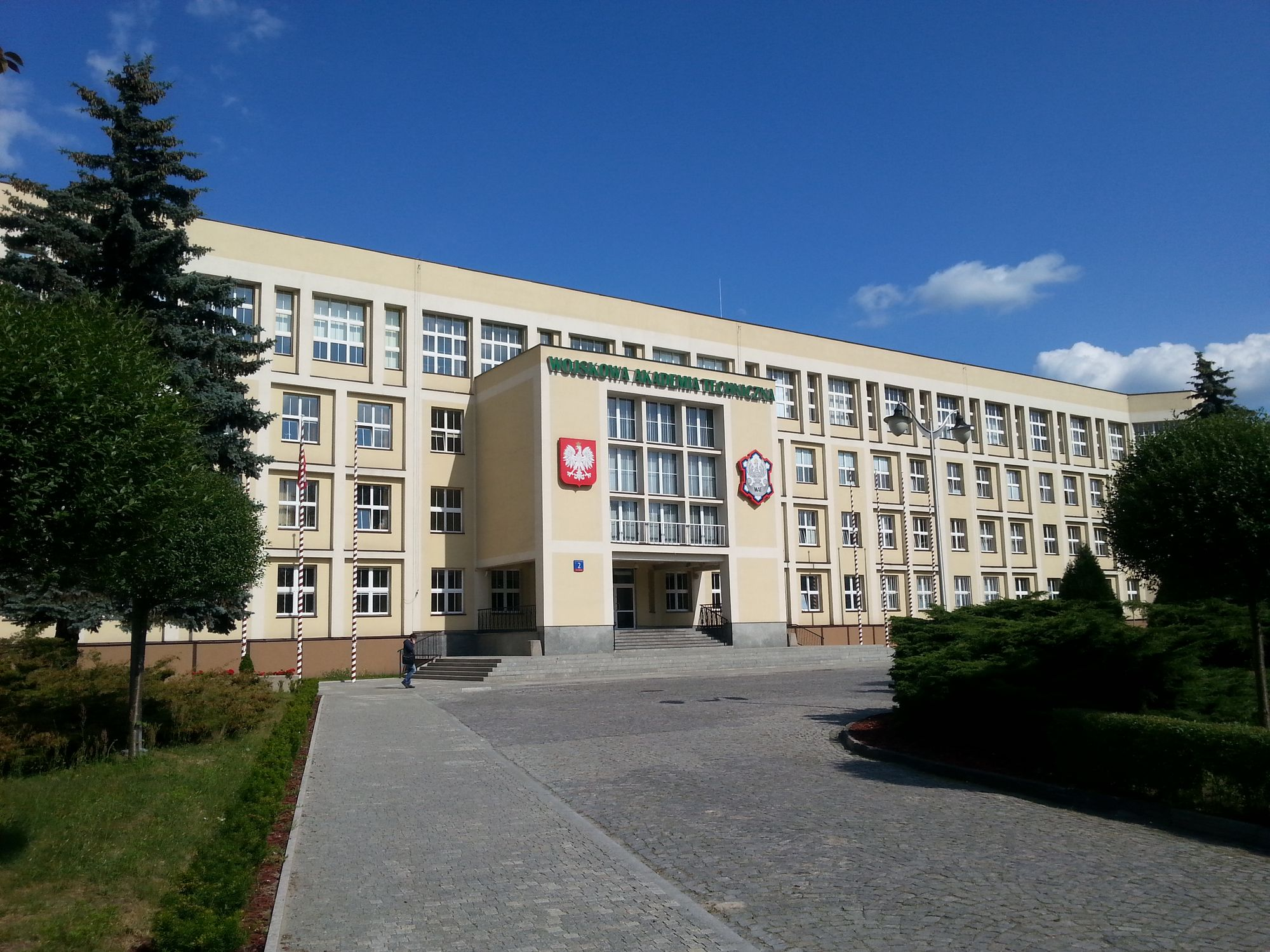
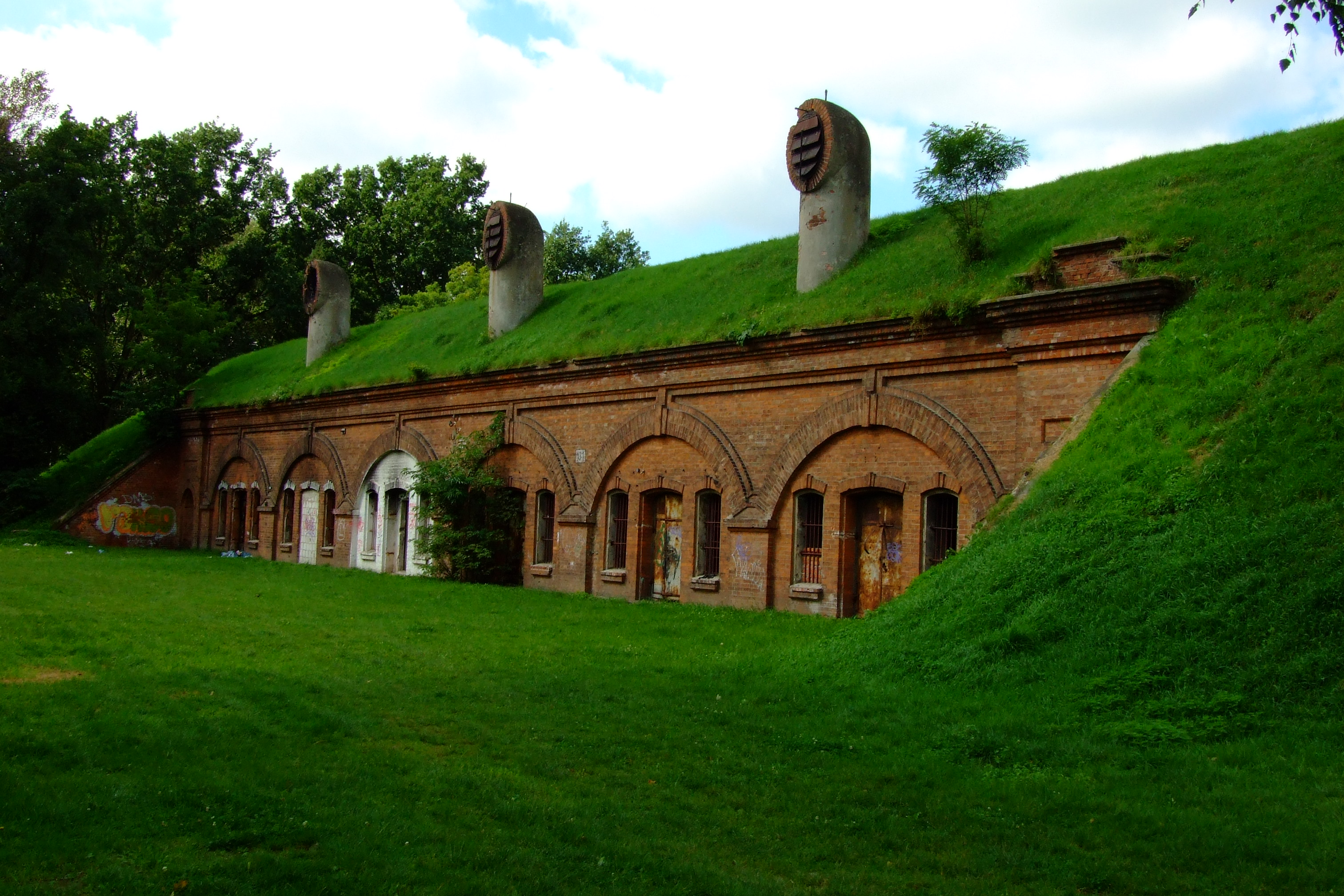
- Apartment buildings in Górczewska Houses in Boernerowo Military University of Technology Bem Fort

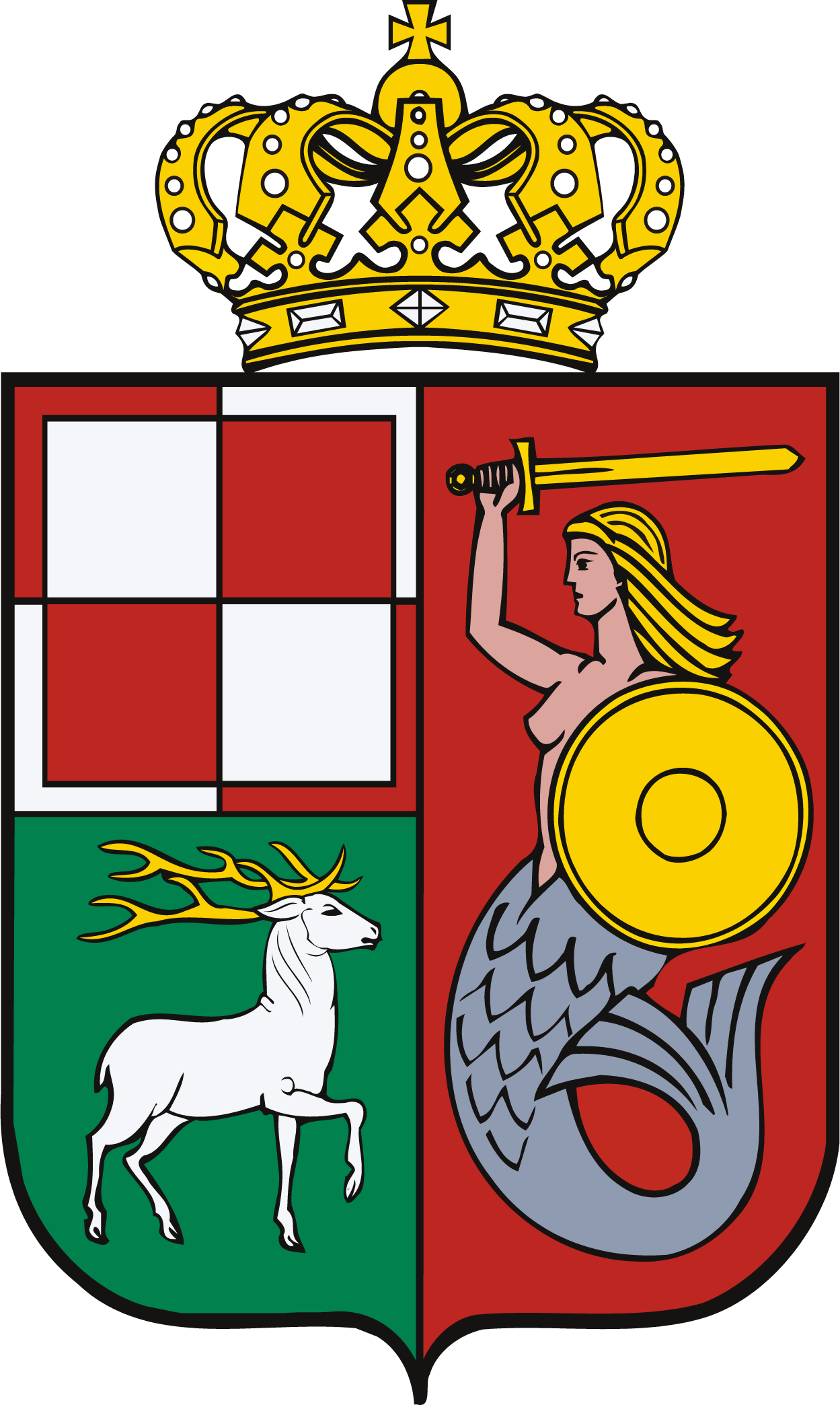
- Coat of arms

- Location of Bemowo within Warsaw
- Coordinates: 52°14′52.2″N 20°54′25.2″E
- Country: Poland
- Voivodeship: Masovian
- City and county: Warsaw
- Establishment: 27 October 2002
- Seat: 70 Powstańców Śląskich Street

Government
  - Mayor: Grzegorz Kuca

Area
  - Total: 24.95 km^{2} (9.63 sq mi)

Population (2024)
  - Total: 128,895
  - Density: 5,166/km^{2} (13,380/sq mi)
- Time zone: UTC+1 (CET)
  - Summer (DST): UTC+2 (CEST)
- Postal code: 01-3xx; 01-4xx
- Area code: +48 22
- Website: bemowo.um.warszawa.pl

Bemowo (Polish: [bɛˈmɔ.vɔ]) is a district of the city of Warsaw, Poland. It has an area of 24.95 km^{2} (9.63 sq mi), and in 2024, it was inhabited by 128,895 people, making it the 7th most populous and 8th largest district of the city. Located at the west edge of the city, it borders districts of Bielany to the north, Wola and Żoliborz to the east, and Ursus and Włochy to the south, with its western border forming the city boundary. There, it borders municipalities of Ożarów Mazowiecki and Stare Babice in Warsaw West County. The district is dominated by residential areas, predominantly featuring high-rise multifamily housing estates such as Nowe Bemowo in the northeast, Górce in the centre, and Chrzanów, Górczewska, Jelonki, and Lazurowa in the south. The area also features a few low-rise single-family neighbourhoods, including Boernerowo, Fort Radiowo, and Groty in the northwest, and Friendship Estate, Nowy Chrzanów, and Stare Jelonki in the southeast. The district also includes the Warsaw Babice Airport, the campus of the Military University of Technology. Additionally, it has the Bemowo metro station, with two more, Lazurowa and Karolin, currently being under construction.

By the 15th century, within the modern district were present villages of Górce and Groty. In the following centuries, more communities were also founded, including Chrzanów, Jelonki, Karolin, and Parysów. In the second half of the 19th century, four forts were built there as part of the fortifications of the Warsaw Fortress, erected around the city by the Imperial Russian Army. In 1923, the Fort IIA was adopted to house the broadcasting infrastructure of the Transatlantic Radiotelegraph Exchange, at the time, one of the largest radio communication stations in the world. It provided stable connections for worldwide communications. It was later destroyed in 1944. In the late 1920s, Jelonki and Górce began developing as suburbs, and in the 1930s, Boernerowo was also founded in the north. In 1950, the Warsaw Babice Airport was opened in the northern Bemowo, which was used by the military until the 1990s. Additionally, in 1951, the Military University of Technology was opened in the district, and in 1952, the Friendship Estate was also constructed in its central east. In the 1970s and 1980s, numerous large high-rise multifamily housing estates were built across Bemowo, including Nowe Bemowo, Nowe Górce, Górczewska, Jelonki, and Lazurowa. In the 2000s, new housing developments were also constructed in Chrzanów and Fort Bema.

The area was incorporated into warsaw in 1951, originally becoming part of the Wola district. In 1994, it was separated into its own administrative unit, the municipality of Warsaw-Bemowo, which was restructured into the Bemowo district in 2002.

== Toponomy ==
The district was named Bemowo in 1998, after the Bem Fort, a historic 19th-century fortification in its northwestern corner, which itself honours Józef Bem, an 18th- and 19th-century engineer and military officer, and veteran of the November Uprising. The name, formed from his surname Bem, with the addition of the suffix -owo, means Bem's settlement. Previously, from 1947 to 1987, it was used as the name of Boernerowo, one of the district's neighbourhoods.

== History ==
=== Until the 20th century ===
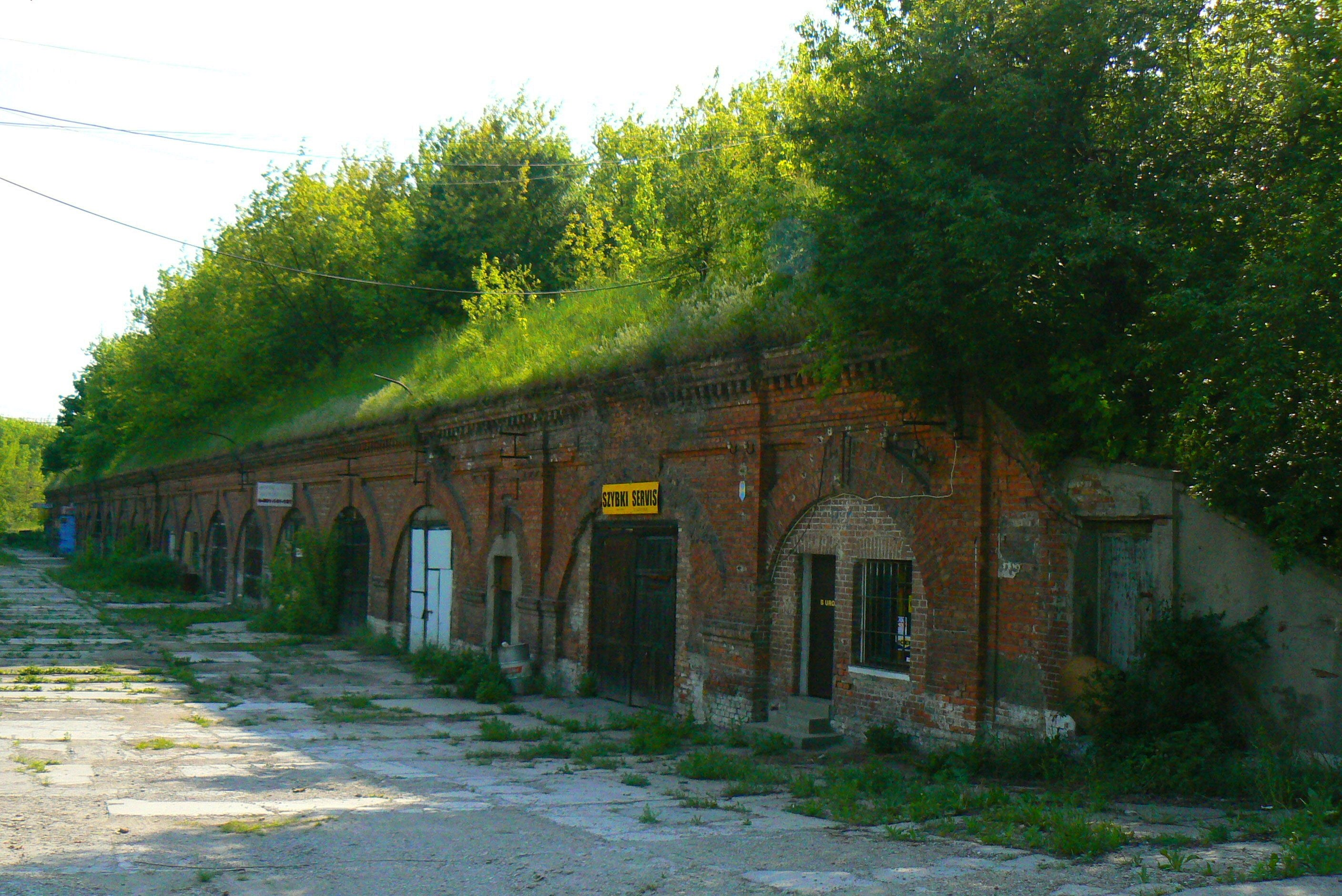
The Fort III, built in Groty in 1868.

By the 15th century, within the central area of the modern Bemowo, were present villages of Górce and Groty, which were owned and inhabited by the petty nobility. The same century, Chrzanów was founded in the south, and in the 16th century, Parysów was also established in north. Between 1655 and 1656, the villages in the area were devastated and destroyed by the Swedish army during the Second Northern War, and were rebuilt afterwards.

In 1794, during the Kościuszko Uprising, the combined Prussian and Russian forces took up positions on the Swedish Mountains, a set of dunes near Parysów, to besiege the nearby city of Warsaw, with their artillery cannons. They were attacked by Polish forces, led by Józef Poniatowski, which managed to briefly occupy the dunes, before being pushed back. They were again captured in an attack led by Jan Henryk Dąbrowski. Another skirmish took place at the Swedish Mountains in 1831 during the November Uprising, when Polish–Lithuanian insurgents, following heavy fighting, were pushed out by the Russian forces, led by Ivan Paskevich.

In the 18th century, Górce came into prosperity, thanks to the proceedings of the election seym, during which nobility members elected monarchs of the Polish–Lithuanian Commonwealth, held at the nearby fields of Młynów, Koło, and Powązki. The village provided the attendees and the staff with housing and food.

In the 19th century, the villages of Jelonki and Nowy Chrzanów were founded in the south. By that time, the village of Karolin was also present in the area.

In 1867, the area of the modern city district was divided into several municipalities, with Blizne including Chrzanów, Górce, Groty, and Jelonki, Młociny including Parysów, and Skorcze including Karolin.

In 1866, the Fort III was built near Groty, as part of the series of fortifications of the Warsaw Fortress, erected around the city by the Imperial Russian Army. In the 1880s, there were also built Fort IIA near Stare Babice, Fort IV near Chrzanów, and Fort P (later renamed to the Bem Fort) near Parysów. They were decommissioned in 1909 and partially demolished in 1913. From 1924 to 1939, the Bem Fort housed an ammunition factory.

Several brickworks across the 18th and 19th centuries, such as Bogumił Schneider's factory in Jelonki, which operated from 1846 to 1940. They sourced clay locally, leaving behind pits, which over time flooded, forming numerous ponds. Most of them were later filled in during the 1940s, as part of the development of new housing in the area, with several remaining to this day.

=== 20th century before the Second World War ===
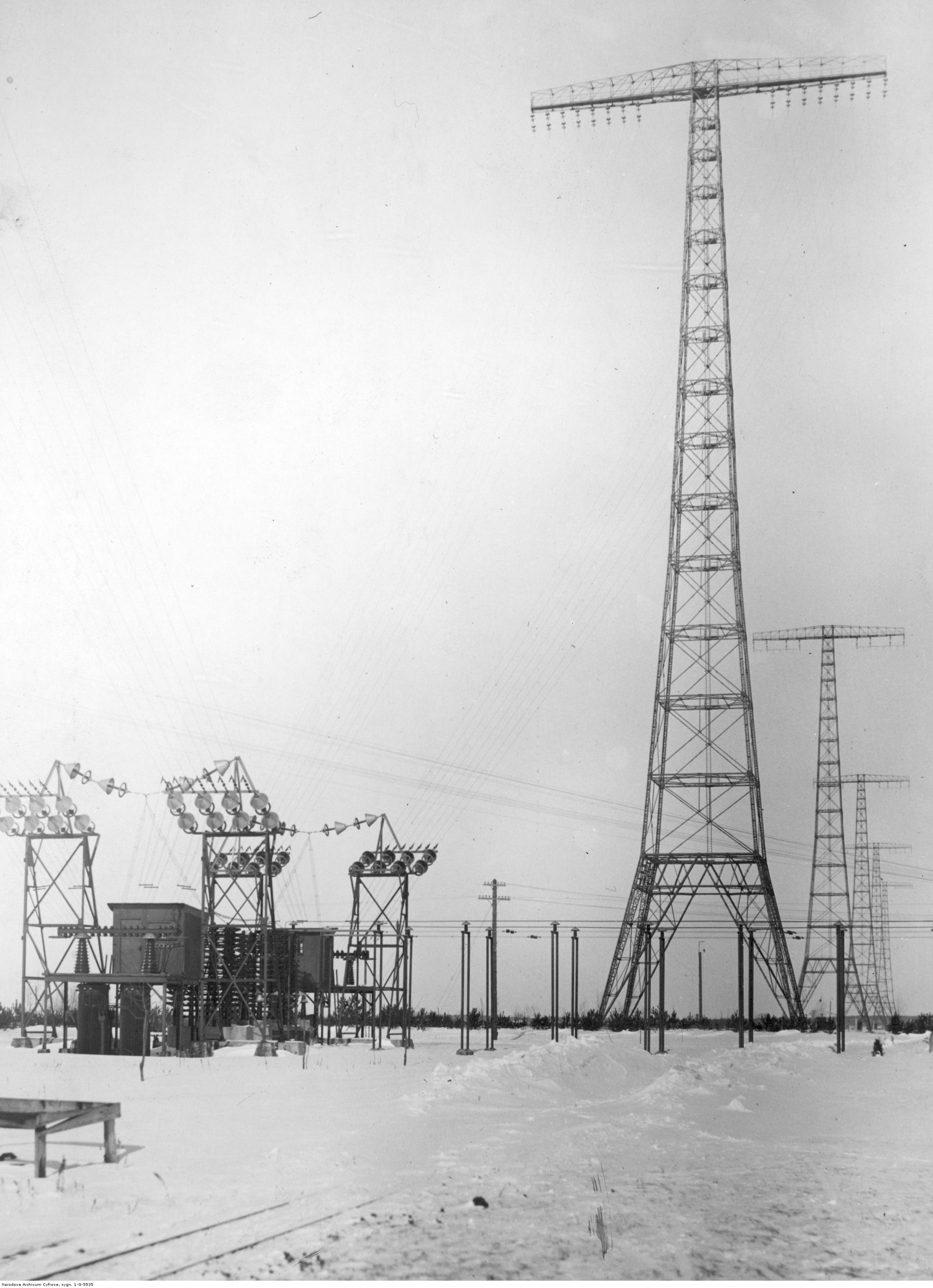
One of the radio masts of the Transatlantic Radiotelegraph Exchange, sometime before 1939.

In 1916, a dirt runway aerodrome was built between Parysów and Fort IIA, for the German Air Combat Forces. In 1919, it was adapted by the Polish government for the use of the Aviation Institute of Technology, a government research institution of aviation technologies. It operated until 1939, and its institutions were inherited in 1953 by the Air Forse Institute of Technology, with majority of its laboratories now located within the nearby neighbourhood of Fort Bema, in the complex centred around 6 Księcia Bolesława Street.

In 1920, a wooden building near Parysów, was adopted into the St. Josaphat Church belonging to the Catholic denomination. According to some theories, said structure could have been the St. Nicholas the Wonderworker Church of the Eastern Orthodox denomination, dating to 1872, however, others suspect it would have been deconstructed by then. In 1966, it was replaced with a new, larger brick building.

In 1923, the Fort IIA was adopted to house the broadcasting infrastructure of the Transatlantic Radiotelegraph Exchange, at the time, one of the largest radio communication stations in the world. The complex included ten 127-metre-tall (416.7 ft) steel radio masts, placed in the nearby Bemowo Woods, in an area spaning 4 km (2.5 miles). They were operated with the 200 kW Alexanderson alternators powered by a 500 kW Diesel engine, providing stable connections and large range, which allowed for worldwide communications, conducted with the Morse code. In 1926, the complex was connected to the power plant in Pruszków, and in 1938, two more radio masts were added. The Transatlantic Radiotelegraph Exchange also had its receiver infrastructure in Grodzisk Mazowiecki, and the Central Operations Office in Warsaw.

In 1927, Jelonki was divided for the construction of villas in accordance to the principles of the garden city movement. In 1932, the settlement had been renamed to Miasto-Ogród Jelonek (Garden Town of Jelonek). A marketplace, known as the John III Sobieski Square, now known as the Castellan Square, was also built there. In the 1920s, a low-rise neighbourhood with single-family detached homes was also developed in Górce.

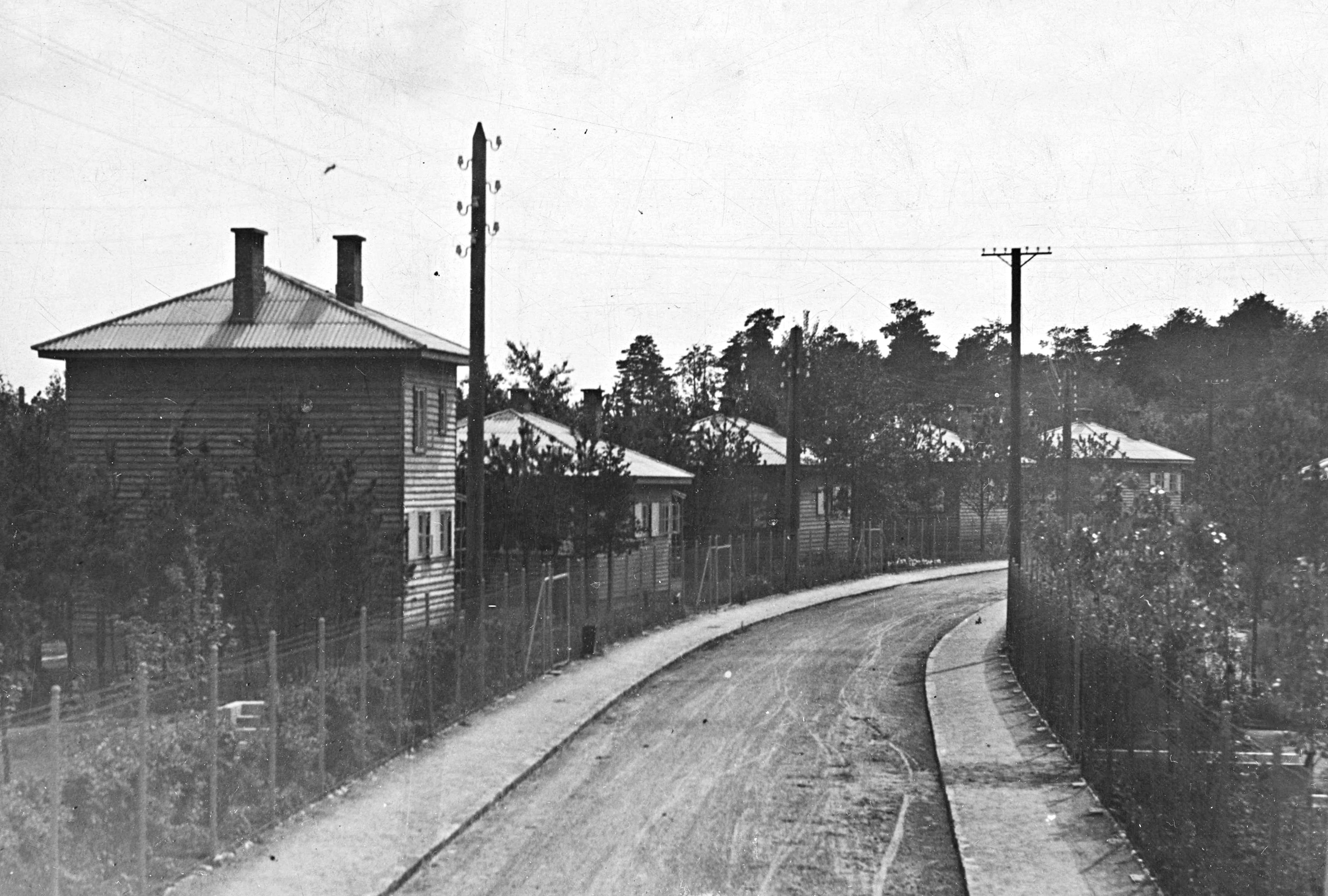
Wooden houses in Boernerowo, built in the early 1930s.

In 1933, a small suburb of Boernerowo, originally known as Osiedle Łączności, was developed nearby the Fort IIA. It was proposed by Ignacy Boerner, the Minister of Post and Telegraphs, to combat the rising housing crisis in the city, and create homes for the employees of the nearby Transatlantic Radiotelegraph Exchange. The estate consisted of detached houses made from wood, to provide affordable housing and keep construction costs low. The construction began in July 1933, and by 1939, the neighbourhood included 275 houses and several other buildings, such as a school, a Catholic chapel, and stores. It had a permanent population of around 1,500 people. In 1933, the suburb of Kolonia im. Aleksandry Piłsudskiej (Aleksandra Piłsudska Colony), was also founded nearby, to provide housing to veterans and their families. Both settlements were joined. In 1936, the suburb was transferred from the municipality of Młociny to Blizne. In 1971, Church of Our Lady of the Sharp Gate was built in place of the former chapel.

In October 1933, Boernerowo was connected to Wola via a tram line, originally designed as B, and later also called A22 and B22. Its tracks went through Księcia Janusza Street and Obozoba Street, connecting to the suburb via a road next to the Bem Fort. It operated until the outbreak of the Warsaw Uprising in 1944, and was reactivated in 1946, as line 20. In 1950, it was replaced by a new line on Dywizjonu 303 and Kaliskiego Streets. In 2011, it was shortened to Kaliskiego Street.

=== Second World War ===
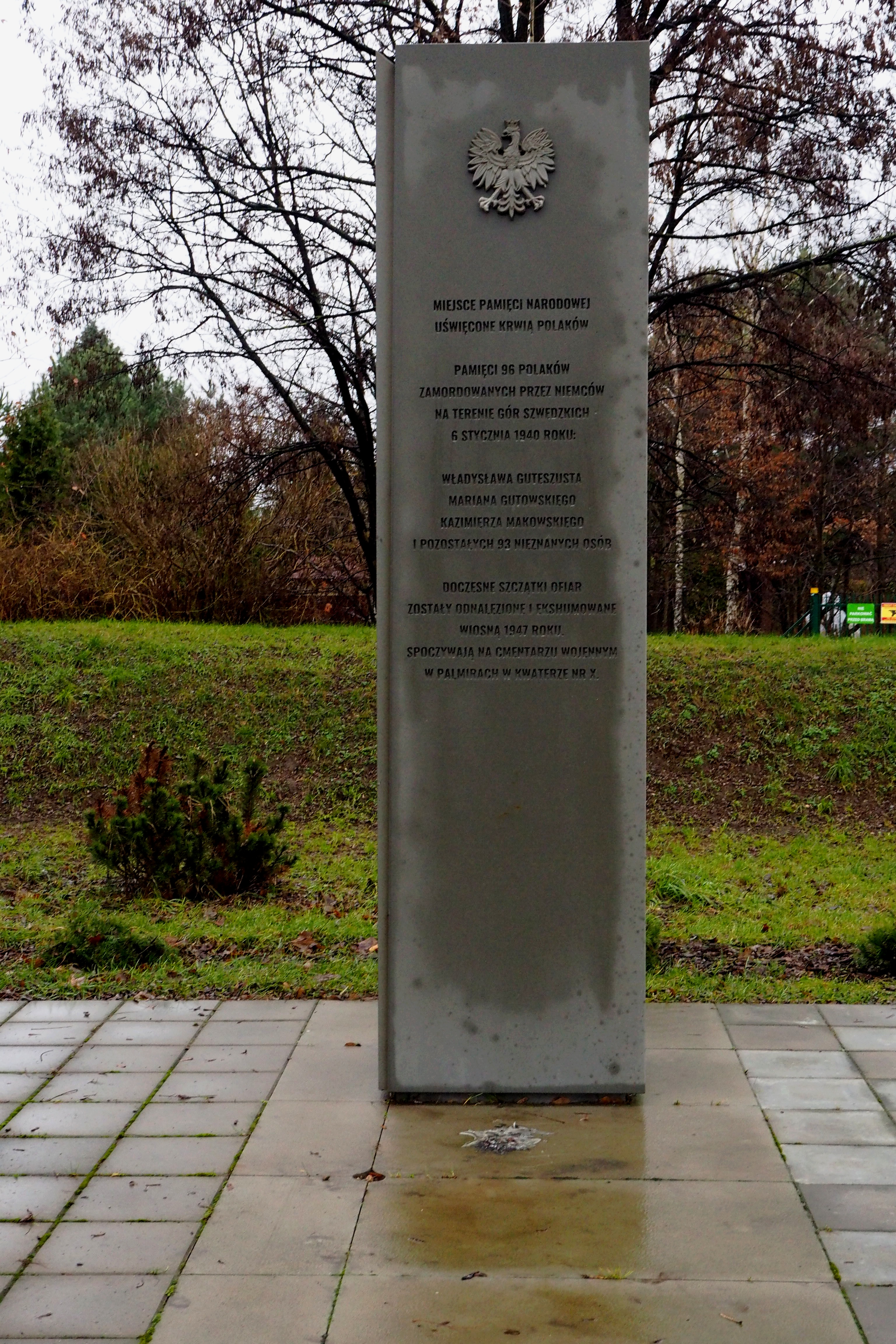
The monument dedicated to the victims executed in 1940 at the Swedish Mountains.

The area was captured by the advancing German Army during the siege of Warsaw in the Second World War. This included Boernerowo, which was captured on 10 September. It was recaptured by Polish soldiers on the night of 14 and 15 September. On 16 September, the 3rd Battalion, together with the 3rd battery of the 54th Artillery Regiment, moved to the Fort IIA, which they defended from heavy attacks on 17 and 18 September. The next they, the battalion attacked the village of Janów, while German forces began an attack on Boernerowo coming from Stare Babice.

On 18 September 1939, Jelonki and Nowy Chrzanów were recaptured in a counter-offensive by the 360th Infantry Regiment of the Polish Armed Forces, commanded by lieutenant colonel Leopold Okulicki. Their forces included four infantry companies, with heavy machine gun platoons, and one mortar platoon. They were also supported by a artillery batteries, a platoon of 7TP light tanks, as well as a company of the Capital Battalion, with the latter being pushed back during the attacks. The motorized platoon suffered heavy loses in an encounter against German Panzer 35(t) light tanks. The villages were captured with severe losses suffered by the Polish infantry, and remained under Polish control until the capitulation of Warsaw on 28 September 1939. In the morning of 19 September, the Capital Battalion of the Polish Armed Forces, led by Józef Spychalski, began an attack on the German-occupied Fort III, from the village of Blizne Łaszczyńskiego. It was aided by the 8th Company of the 26th Infantry Regiment, attacking from Boernerowo in the north. The German forces pushed back two attacks, causing significant casualties to the Polish side, which fortified its positions 500 metres from the fort. The fort was abandoned and captured on 26 September.

On 27 September, German forces captured the Fort II in Wawrzyszew, exposing Polish positions, and surrounding the 3rd Battalion from the north, capturing the Swedish Mountains. On the same day, the 19th Infantry Division of the Germany Army captured Boernerowo and the Transatlantic Radiotelegraph Exchange, following the heavy fighting. The battalion suffered devastating losses, with the remaining survivors being captured. Overall, around 85 to 90% of the soldiers of the 3rd Battalion were killed during the siege of Warsaw.

The Bem Fort, defended by the 202nd Company of the 4th Battalion of the 30th Kaniów Riflemen Regiment, and later by the 144th Infantry Regiment of the Polish Armed Forces, despite numerous German attacks, remained under Polish control until the capitulation of Warsaw on 28 September 1939.

In December 1939, while under the German occupation, the 7th Legions Infantry Regiment formed the underground resistance group Madagascar, later renamed Garłuch in 1942. It had its base of operations in Boernerowo, in a house at 11 Boernera Street. Lieutenant Henryk Malec became its commander and was replaced in 1942 by deputy lieutenant Władysław Kłodziński. It became one of the largest groups of Polish resistance, and the main unit operating in the area. In 1941, Tadeusz Towarnick founded the insurgent group Wapiennik, also known as division unit 993/W, with its base of operations in a house at 15 Parkowa Street. Both groups carried out numerous military and sabotage operations against German occupiers and their collaborators.

On 6 January 1940, German officers executed and buried 96 people at the nearby Swedish Mountains. It was one of the earliest mass executions committed in Poland during the conflict. The identity of the victims remains unknown. The bodies were exhumed in 1947.

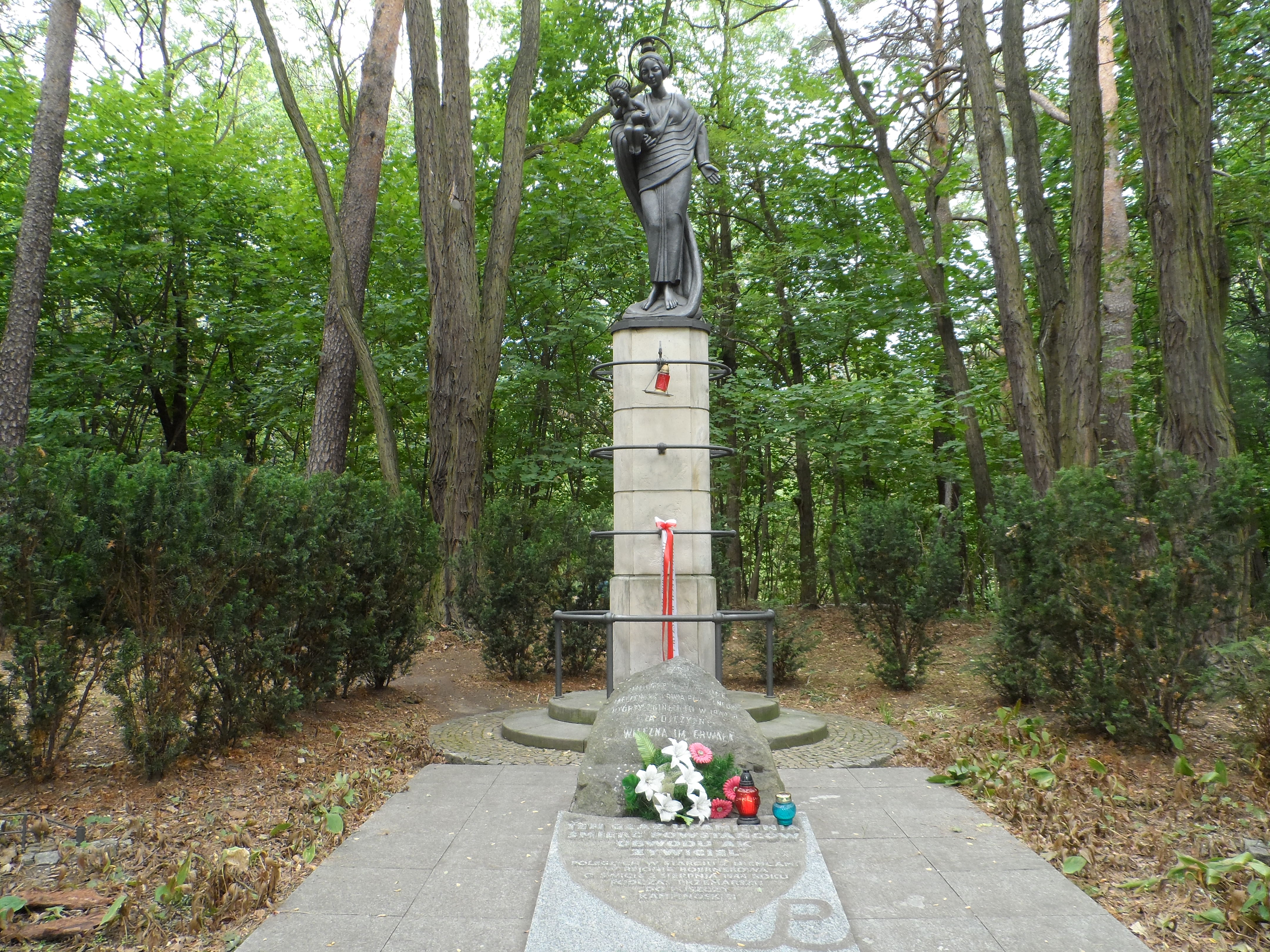
The monument commemorating the battle of Boernerowo of 1944.

On 2 August 1944, a resistance company of around 100 soldiers, led by Jerzy Terczyński, cryptonym Straż (Guard), was attacked by the occupant soldiers to the north of Boernerowo. The unit was retreating from Żoliborz and Bielany, while being separated and without means of communication with the rest of the insurgent forces. Polish soldiers, while in an open field, were ambushed and surrounded by German forces and shot at with machine guns. Additionally, they were shot at and rammed by a German tank. Over 70 resistance soldiers were killed, with a small number managing to escape, and a few being captured and executed afterwards. The German side suffered a few casualties and injuries.

Through the conflict, hundreds of people moved from Warsaw to Boernerowo in search of refuge after losing their houses due to bombings or expulsion. Due to this, the population of the settlement doubled from around 1,500 to 3,000 people, with new arrivals being taken in by the local inhabitants. During and after the destruction of Warsaw, Władysław Graff, the mayor of Boernerowo, issued the backdated resident registration documents to the refugees. It was done at risk to himself and his family, as, according to German law, sheltering potential insurgents would be punished by death. Simultaneously, people began also moving to Górce, with new houses built there being mostly provisional structures built from wood or rubble recovered from destruction in the city.

During the occupation of the city, German forces used the Transatlantic Radiotelegraph Exchange to communicate with the crews of their U-boat submarines. The entire radio broadcasting infrastructure was destroyed on 16 January 1945, by German forces retreating from the advancing Red Army.

After the settlement was captured by the Red Army, on 17 January 1945, the People's Commissariat for Internal Affairs of the Soviet Union, set up a base in a former provisional precinct of the Blue Police in a house at 38 and 38A Dostepna Street. They began to capture soldiers of the Home Army operating in the area and held them in a jail in the building's basement. Some soldiers of Garłuch continued activity within the area, engaging in resistance against the Soviet Union, including freeing some of the prisoners.

=== Communist period ===
In 1945, the government requisitioned several houses in Boernerowo, in order to turn them into barracks for the officers of the Internal Security Corps, a special-purpose military formation of the Ministry of Public Security. The unit itself had its headquarters in the neighbourhood until 10 August 1945, when it moved to Mokotów. The requisition of the neighbourhood was announced in 1946, and put into the law in 1949, distributing the land between the Ministry of Public Security, Military University of Technology, and 1st Airborne Fighter Regiment. The remaining residents of Boernerowo were evicted between 1951 and 1953, with some of them being arrested, tortured in prisons, or disappearing in unknown circumstances. In 1959, the National Council of Warsaw passed a resolution, allowing former owners to officially petition for the return of their property. However, in practice, the process was made intentionally difficult or impossible by the government clerks. Moreover, many of the houses were instead sold by the government for symbolic 1 złoty to new residents, without the knowledge of the previous owners. Numerous people never regained their property, and many of the houses still belong to the government.

Between 1946 and 1950, the Warsaw Babice Airport was built in the area, with two concrete crossing runways. It was the first airfield in Poland designed for the jet aircraft. It was constructed mostly with the labour of around 2,000 German prisoners of war. After 1948, they were replaced with members of the paramilitary youth organisation Service of Poland. Its location included the former aerodrome and the Swedish Mountains, which were flattened in 1949. Additionally, the nearby Bem Fort was used as a supply base. The airport took on the role of numerous smaller aerodromes around the city, which were closed down following its opening, and was owned and used by the military. Its existence and purpose remained classified from the public until 1957. At its peak, the airport had seven hangars and three air traffic control towers. On 24 July 1956, the Tupolev Tu-104 landed on the airfield, becoming the first civilian jet aircraft in the country. On 19 October 1956, Nikita Khrushchev, the General Secretary of the Communist Party of the Soviet Union, arrived at the airport during his visit to Poland. It was connected with the appointment of Władysław Gomułka as the First Secretary of the Polish United Workers' Party, and the following political crisis between both countries. In the following years, the airport was also visited by Richard Nixon, the Vice President of the United States, in 1972, and Charles de Gaulle, the President of France, in 1967.

In 1949, the Warszawa Główna Towarowa railway station for cargo trains was opened at to the south of Jelonki and Połczyńska Streets. In 1952, the Warszawa Jelonki railway station was established near the corner of Strąkowska and Wincentego Pola Streets.

On 14 May 1951, the area was incorporated into the city of Warsaw, becoming part of the Wola district. On 29 December 1989, following an administrative reform in the city, it became part of the municipality of Warsaw-Wola. On 25 March 1994, it was separated from it, as the municipality of Warsaw-Bemowo, which, on 27 October 2002, was restructured into the city district of Bemowo. In 1997, it was subdivided into ten areas of the City Information System.

In 1951, the campus complex of the Military University of Technology was opened between Radiowa, Powstańców Śląskich, Dywizjonu 303, Kocjana, and Kartezjusza Streets, with its main building being placed on 2 Kaliskiego Street. In 1950, the former tram line to Boernerowo, closed in 1944, was replaced with new trakcks, crossing the campus along Dywizjonu 303 and Kaliskiego Streets. In 1976, the Institute of Plasma Physics and Laser Microfusion, a government research organisation studying plazma, was opened with its facility located at 23 Hery Street, within the university campus.

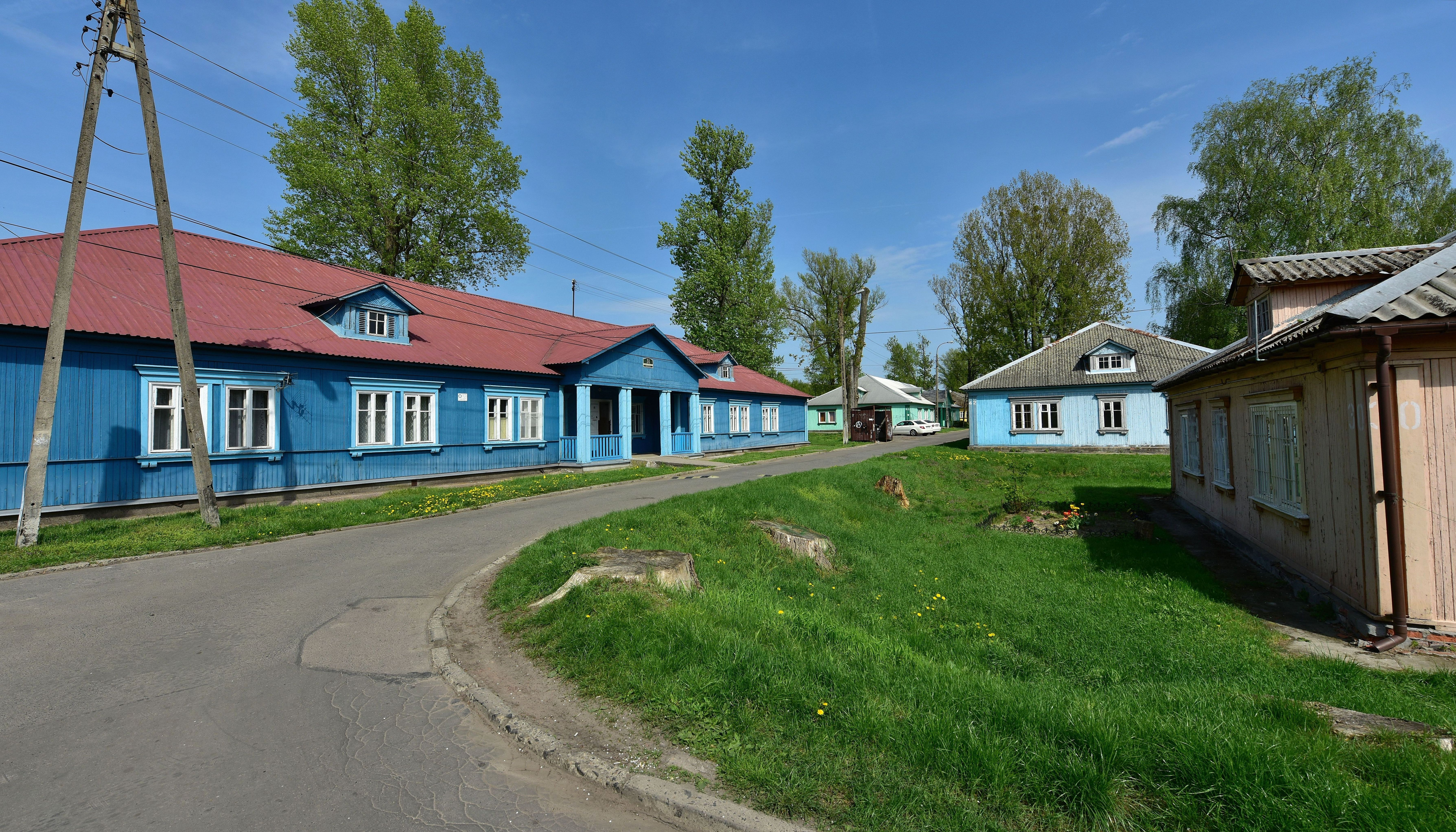
The wooden houses of the Friendship Estate, dating to 1952.

In 1952, the Friendship Estate, was developed to the north of Jelonki. It provided housing for several thousand labourers from the Soviet Union, employed at the construction of the Palace of Culture and Science. The government acquired the land from the owners via the compulsory purchase. Two types of wooden buildings were built in the neighbourhood; pavilions with suites for labourers and single-family detached houses for technicians. They were shipped in prefabricated pieces to the city, and assembled on site. According to some sources, a portion of the buildings were shipped from the prisoner-of-war camp Stalag I-B near Olsztynek, Poland. The neighbourhood also included a cinema, a student club, a bathhouse, a medical clinic, a boiler room, and two pitches. In 1952, it was connected to a sewage network, with the construction of the nearby pumping station. At its peak, the neighbourhood had 4,500 inhabitants. Numerous festivals, Polish and Soviet youth meetings, and sports competitions were hosted there. After the end of the construction of the Palace of Culture and Science in 1955, the neighbourhood was given by the city to the Ministry of Higher Education, which designated it for student housing for the universities in the city. In September 1955, it was inhabited by 3,000 students, as well as teaching assistants. The student festival Jelonkalia has also begun being hosted there annually.

In 1953, the Institute of Energetics was founded to the south of Chrzanów and Karolin, as a research centre on the energy transfer.

In 1958, association football club Robotniczy Klub Sportowy Świt merged with club Ludowy Klub Sportowy Lech Jelonki, which played on the pitch at Połczyńska Street in Jelonki. In 1960, the club again merged with Dąb Jelonki, taking over its pitch at 12 Oświatowa Street. In the following years, it was acquired by the Warsaw Gasworks, with most of the players being its employees, and renamed to Gazowniczy Klub Sportowy Świt Warszawa. Later, it became a property of PGNiG, a state-controlled oil and gas company.

In 1968, the Church of the Exaltation of the Holy Cross, belonging to the Catholic denomination, was built in Jelonki at 31 Brygadzistów Street.

In 1974, the Wola Heating Plant was opened at 21 Połczyńska Street near Jelonki, as part of the city's heat network.

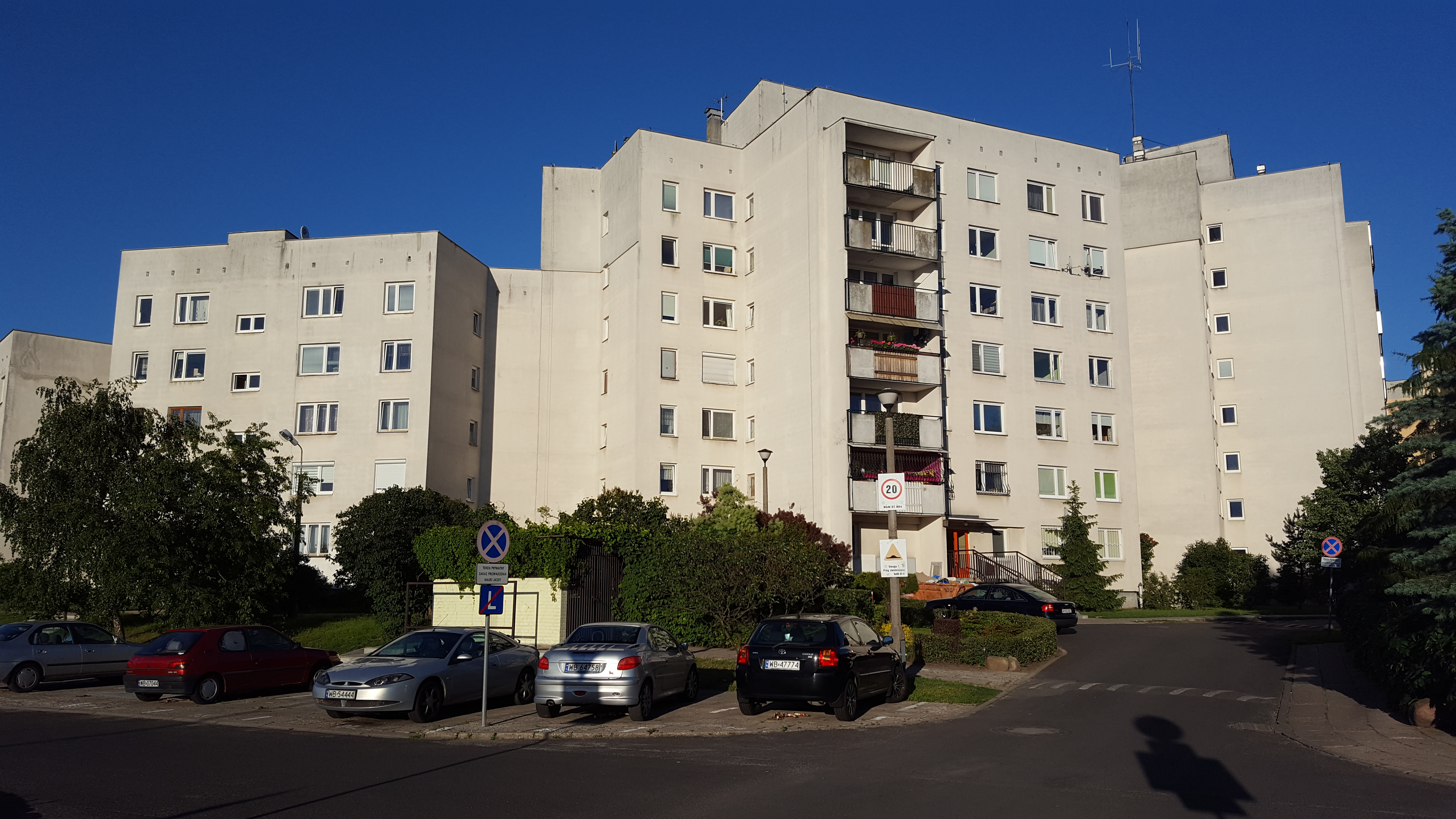
The apartment buildings in Nowe Bemowo, built in the 1980s.

Throughout the 1970s and the 1980s, several housing estates were developed across the district. They consisted of apartment buildings, constructed in the large panel system technique. This included the neighbourhoods of Górczewska, Jelonki, Lazurowa, Nowe Górce, and Nowe Bemowo. Additionally, the Górczewska Park was developed in 1980 around the buildings of the housing estate Górczewska. In 2008 there was opened an amphitheatre. Moreover, two small housing estates with low-rise single-family housing were developed in Groty.

As the housing began developing around the Warsaw Babice Airport, at the end of the 1980s, it was decided to scale down the airfield. Its eastern runway and portion of the hangars were removed and sold for the housing development. The runway and several taxiways in the area, were redeveloped into roads, with the main one becoming the extension of Powstańców Śląskich Street. The airport was mostly demilitarised in 1991, and given for the use of the Polish Medical Air Rescue, Warsaw Aeroclub, and several training organisations. On 20 September 1996, it hosted a concert by Michael Jackson, during his HIStory World Tour, with 120,000 attendees. Since then, it has hosted numerous other concerts, including by Madonna (2009), AC/DC (2010), Iron Maiden (2011), and Metallica (2012).

Since 1987, the Schneider Villa at 59 Połczyńska Street in Jelonki, houses the Warsaw Wola Pentecostal Church.

=== Democratic period ===
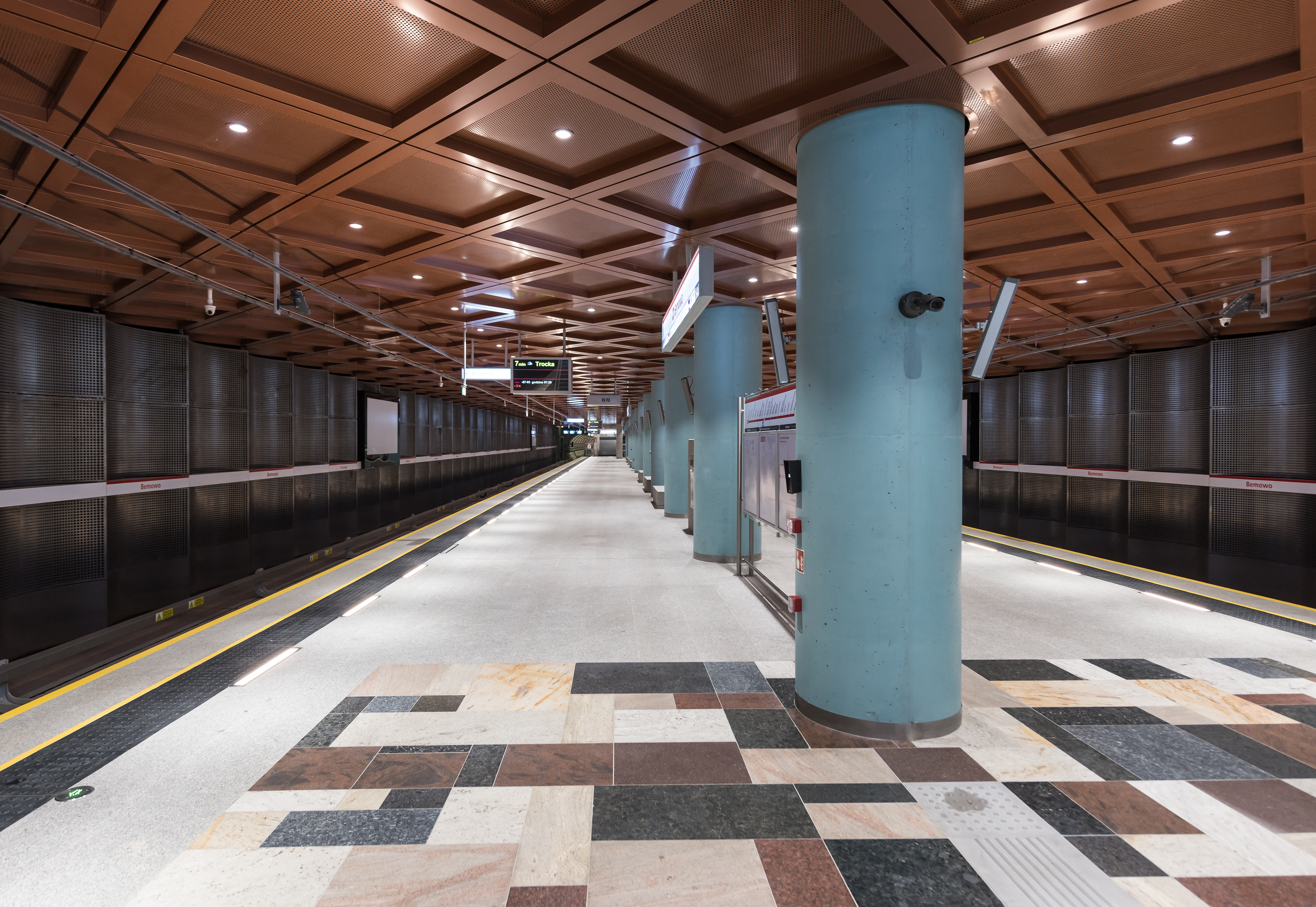
The Bemowo metro station, opened in 2022.

In 1991, the St. Luke the Evangelist Church of the Catholic denomination was opened at 173 Górczewska Street, based in a wooden chapel. It burned down on 24 September 2004. A new temporary chapel was built in 2004, while the construction of a new church building has been ongoing since 2001. Additionally, another Catholic temple, the Church of Mary the Mother of God, was built in 1995, at 13 Muszlowa Street.

In 1992, a tram line was built alongside Górczewska, Powstańców Śląskich, and Połczyńska Streets, as part of the line connecting Górce to the Wola Cemetery. In 1997, it was expanded further to the north along Powstańców Śląskich Street and Radiowa, forming connections with lines on Górczewska and Dywizjonu 303 Street, and the neighbourhood of Nowe Bemowo. In 2015, it was again expanded to the north connecting Bemowo to Bielany.

In 1999, the shopping mall Galeria Bemowo was opened at 126 Powstańców Śląskich Street. The plans of its deconstruction and replacement with a housing estate were announced in 2025.

In the 1990s, an abandoned airport hangar at 40 Obrońców Tobruku Street in Fort Bema, was adopted into the Hala OSiR Bemowo sports hall, hosting Legia Warsaw basketball section.

In 2000, the Bemowo Town Hall, which houses the district government, was opened at 70 Powstańców Śląskich Street.

Throughout the 2000s, housing estates of apartment buildings were developed in the neighbourhoods of Chrzanów, as well, as around the Bem Fort, which itself was adopted into a park.

In 2006, the Bemowo Cultural Centre was opened at 18 Rozłogi Street.

Between 2008 and 2011, a fragment of the Expressway S8 was built crossing the district.

In 2014, the St. John Paul II Parish of the Catholic Church, was established, currently residing in a provisional chapel at 48 Obrońców Tobruku Street, with plans for the construction of a permanent church in the future.

In 2022, the Bemowo station of the M2 line of the Warsaw Metro rapid transit underground system, was opened at the intersection of Górczewska and Powstańców Śląskich Streets. Since 2022, two more stations, Lazurowa at the intersection of Górczewska and Lazurowa Streets, and Karolin at the intersection of Sochaczewska and Połczyńska Streets, are also being constructed. Both are planned to be opened in 2026.

== Government ==
=== Mayor and district council ===
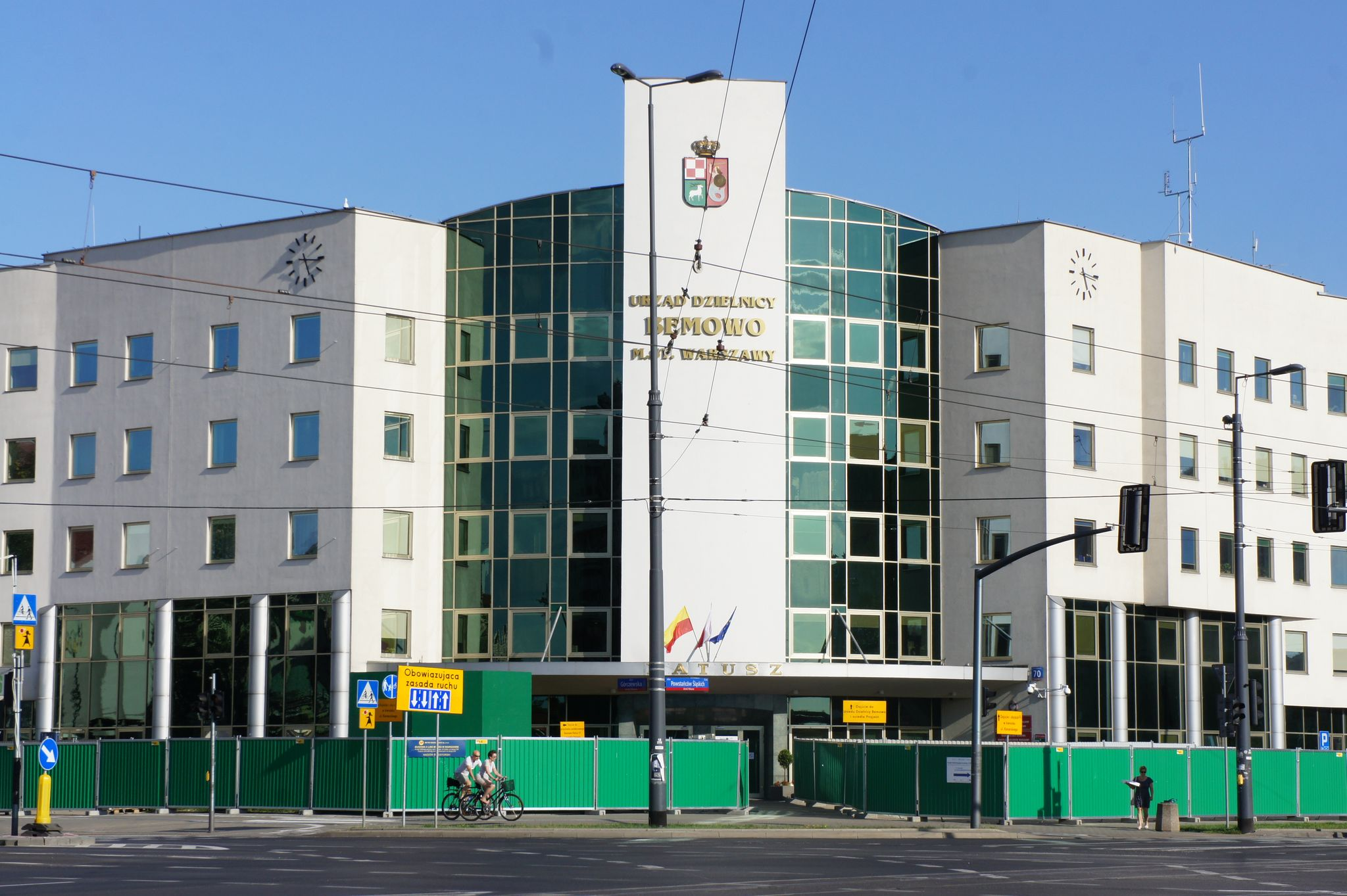
The Bemowo Town Hall.

Bemowo is one of the eighteen districts of the city of Warsaw. Its seat is located at 70 Powstańców Śląskich Street. The district government is divided into two branches, the management board as the executive branch, and an elected council with 25 members, as the legislative and regulatory branch. The government is led by the mayor (Polish: burmistrz). Since 1994, the office has been held by:

- 1994–1996: Marek Tichy;
- 1996–1998: Witold Płotczyk;
- 1998–2002: Wiesław Sikorski;
- 2002–2006: Włodzimierz Całka;
- 2006–2013: Jarosław Jan Dąbrowski
- 2013–2014: Albert Stoma;
- 2014: Krzysztof Strzałkowski;
- 2014–2015: Krzysztof Zygrzak;
- 2015–2016: Marek Lipiński;
- 2016–2018: Michał Grodzki;
- 2018–2024: Urszula Kierzkowska;
- 2024–present: Grzegorz Kuca.

District council membership
Party	2002–2006	2006–2010	2010–2014	2014–2018	2018–2024	2024–2029
Bemowo Local Government Association	—N/a	—N/a	—N/a	2	—N/a	—N/a
Civic Coalition	—N/a	—N/a	—N/a	—N/a	11	18
Civic Platform	4	9	14	7	—N/a	—N/a
Democratic Left Alliance and Labour Union	11	—N/a	—N/a	—N/a	—N/a	—N/a
Jarosław Dąbrowski for the Mayor of Bemowo	—N/a	—N/a	—N/a	9	—N/a	—N/a
Jarosław Dąbrowski for the Mayor of Bemowo and Bemowo Local Government Association	—N/a	—N/a	—N/a	—N/a	9	—N/a
Law and Justice	8	6	5	7	5	5
Left and Democrats	—N/a	5	—N/a	—N/a	—N/a	—N/a
Our City Local Government Association	—N/a	3	3	—N/a	—N/a	—N/a
We Choose Bemowo and Poland 2050	—N/a	—N/a	—N/a	—N/a	—N/a	2

=== Subdivisions ===
The subdivision of Bemowo into the areas of the City Information System.

Bemowo is subdivided into ten areas of the City Information System, a municipal standardized system of street signage. This includes:

- Bemowo-Lotnisko;
- Boernerowo;
- Chrzanów;
- Fort Bema;
- Fort Radiowo;
- Górce;
- Groty;
- Jelonki Północne;
- Jelonki Południowe;
- Lotnisko.

== Demographics ==
=== Population ===
In 2024, Bemowo had a population of 128,895 people, making up around 6.9% of the city population, and being the 7th most populous district. In contrast with previous years, its population had slightly diminished from 129,255 in 2021, while experiencing steady growth until then, with 125,119 in 2020, 114,407 in 2010, and 104,663 in 2002. In 2023, the majority of the population was in the working age of between 18 and 64, with 77,367 people, or 59.9%. A total of 25,061 people, or 19.4%, were under the age of 18, while 26,760, or 20.7%, were over 65. Bemowo has an area of 24.95 km^{2} (9.63 sq mi), making up around 4.8% of the city, and being its 8th largest district. In 2024, it had the population density of around 5,200 people per km^{2} (13,000 people per sq mi).

Historical population
Year	1950	1960	1970	1978	1988	1994	2002	2005	2010	2020	2021	2023	2024
Pop.	19,698	21,811	40,343	41,856	85,003	97,816	104,663	105,532	114,407	125,119	129,255	129,188	128,895
±%	—	+10.7%	+85.0%	+3.8%	+103.1%	+15.1%	+7.0%	+0.8%	+8.4%	+9.4%	+3.3%	−0.1%	−0.2%

=== Religion ===
The district features several Catholic, including: Church of the Exaltation of the Holy Cross, Church of Mary the Mother of God, Church of Our Lady of the Sharp Gate, St. Josaphat Church, and St. Luke the Evangelist Church, as well as the St. John Paul II Parish Chapel. Additionally, there is also the Warsaw Wola Pentecostal Church, housed in the historic Schneider Villa at 59 Połczyńska Street. The district also includes the Bemowo Cemetery in Boernerowo.

== Housing and economy ==
Bemowo is dominated by high-rise multifamily housing estates of apartment buildings. This includes Nowe Bemowo in the northeast, Górce in the centre, and Chrzanów, Górczewska, Jelonki, and Lazurowa in the south. The area also features several low-rise single-family neighbourhoods, including Boernerowo, Fort Radiowo, and Groty in the northwest, and Nowy Chrzanów, and Stare Jelonki in the southeast. It also includes the Friendship Estate, a neighbourhood designated for student housing, with low-rise detached houses.

The district also includes the shopping mall Galeria Bemowo at 126 Powstańców Śląskich Street.

Additionally, the district includes the Wola Heating Plant at 21 Połczyńska Street, which forms part of the city's heat network.

== Higher education and science ==
Bemowo includes the Military University of Technology, with its main building seated at 2 Kaliskiego Street, and its campus located between Radiowa, Powstańców Śląskich, Dywizjonu 303, Kocjana, and Kartezjusza Streets, in the northwestern portion of the district. Bemowo also features government research facilities, such as the Air Force Institute of Technology, the Institute of Energetics, and the Institute of Plasma Physics and Laser Microfusion.

== Culture and sports ==
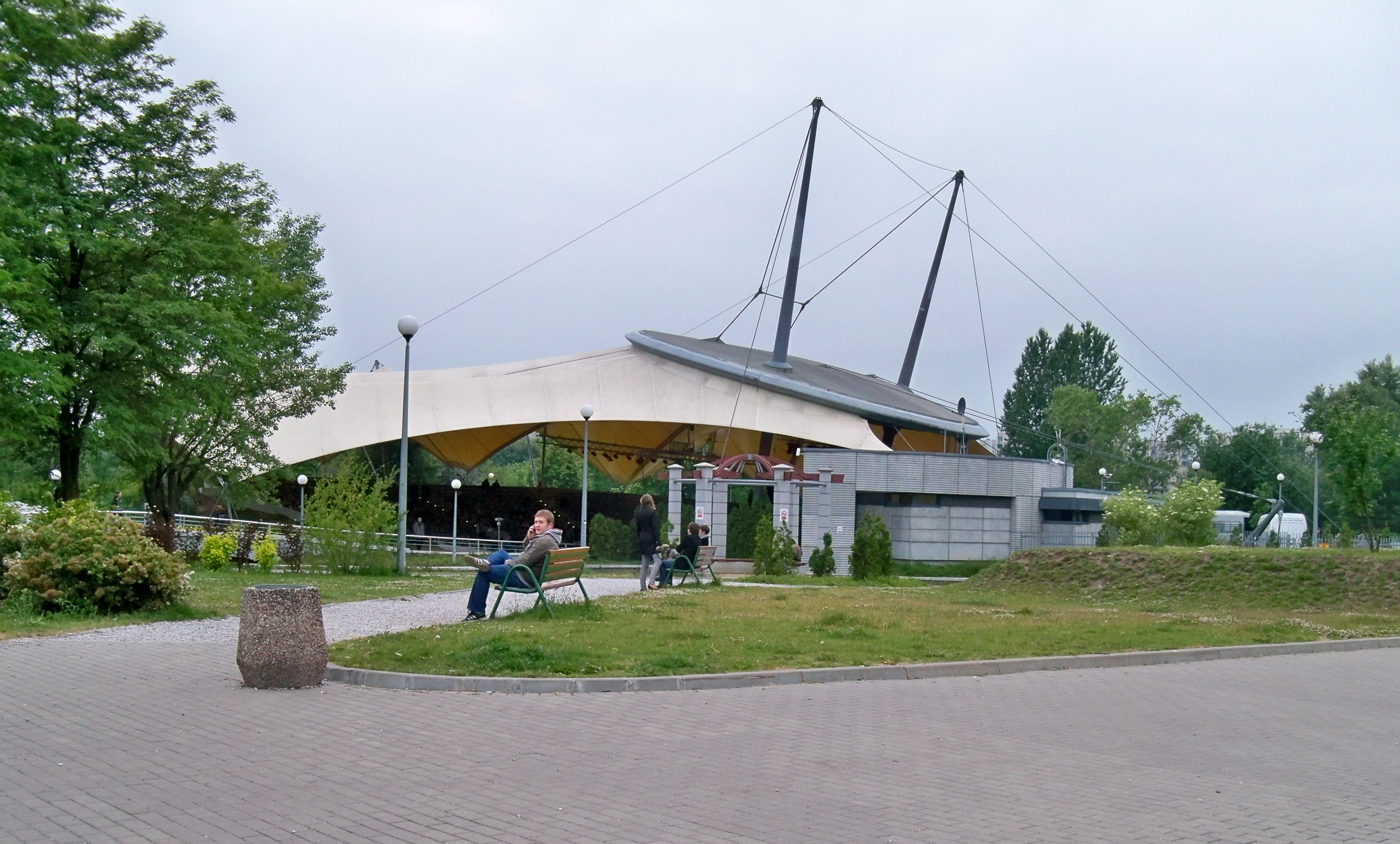
The amphitheatre in the Górczewska Park.

Among the cultural institutions, the district features the Bemowo Cultural Centre, Górczewska Amphitheatre, and Imka Theatre. Additionally, the Friendship Estate, hosts annually the student festival Jelonkalia. Bemowo includes several historical buildings, such as four historic demilitarised fortifications from the 19th century, including the Bem Fort, Fort IIA, Fort III, and Fort IV.

The district also features the Hala OSiR Bemowo sports hall, which hosts the Legia Warsaw basketball section, and has a capacity of 1,416 spectators during the matches, and 2,300 during the concerts. Bemowo also includes the homefield of the association football club Gazowniczy Klub Sportowy Świt Warszawa, placed at 12 Oświatowa Street, which has a capacity of 140 spectators.

== Parks and nature ==
The green urban areans of Bemowo features the Górczewska Park, within the neighbourhood of Górczewska, which, among other amenities, includes an amphitheatre, as well as the Castellan Square in Stare Jelonki. The area surrounding the Bem Fort forms another park in the district, in its northeast corner.

The area near the district's northeastern boundary is covered by Bemowo Woods, which also has the status of a park.

Bemowo features several small ponds, such as the Green Pond, Jelonek Clay Pits, Jeziorzec Pond, and Schneider Clay Pits.

== Transport ==
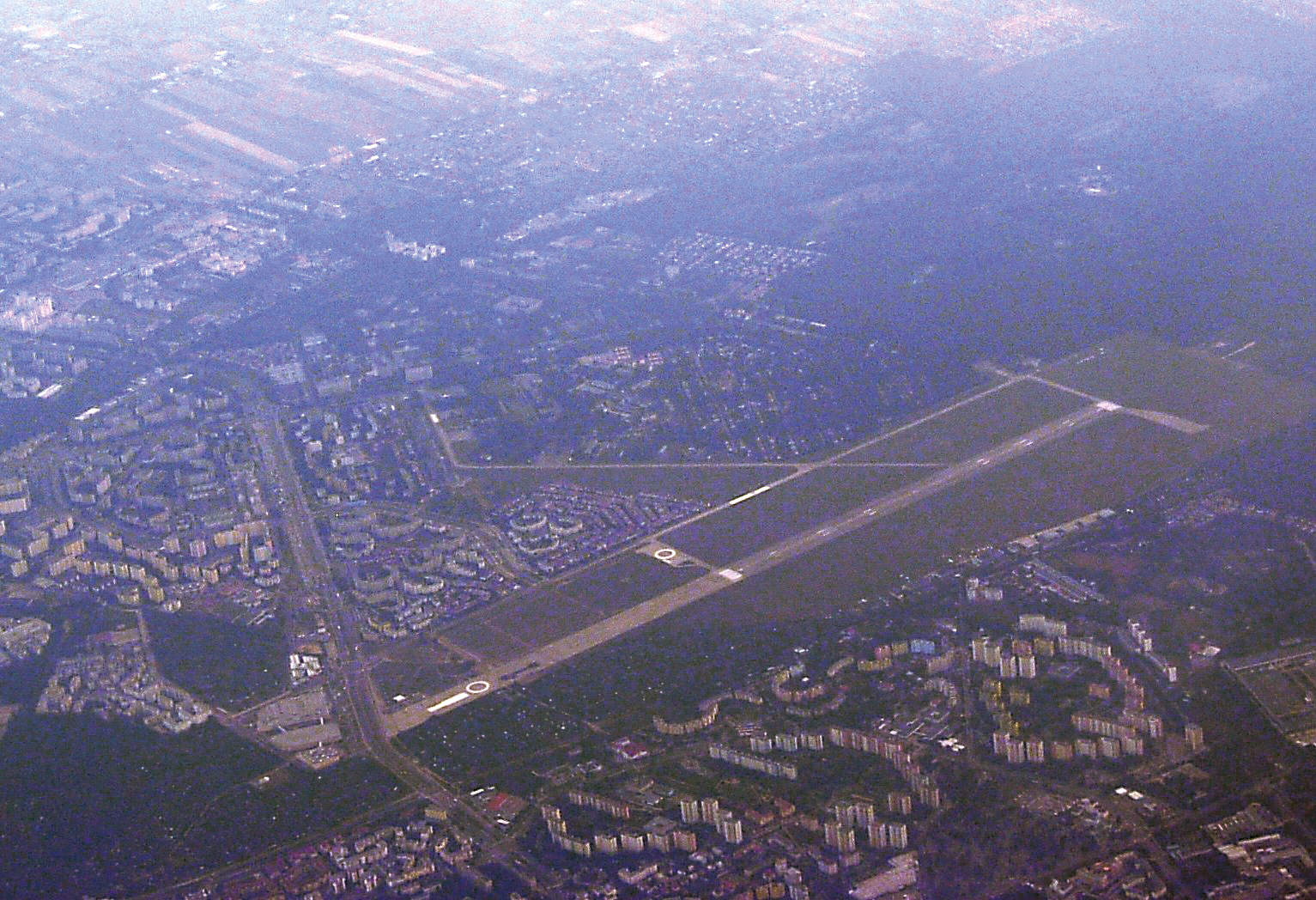
The aerial view of the Warsaw Babice Airport.

Bemowo includes the Warsaw Babice Airport with one concrete runway. It is mainly used by the Polish Medical Air Rescue, Warsaw Aeroclub, and several training organisations. It also has the Bemowo station of the M2 line of the Warsaw Metro rapid transit underground system, at the intersection of Górczewska and Powstańców Śląskich Street. Currently, two more stations, Lazurowa and Karolin are under construction. Additionally, the district includes two railway stations, the Warszawa Główna Towarowa for cargo trains near Połczyńska Street, and Warszawa Jelonki for passenger trains, near the corner of Strąkowska and Wincentego Pola Streets. Bemowo is also well connected with tram and bus networks, and its crossed by a portion of the expressway S8 to the east.

== Symbols ==
The coat of arms of Bemowo was adopted on 11 January 1996. It consists of a French-style escutcheon (shield) divided vertically into two halves, with the left half being further divided horizontally into two fields. The right half depicts the Mermaid of Warsaw, a mythical creature which the symbol of the city present in its coat of arms. She is a mermaid with the top body of a naked human woman with beige skin and yellow (golden) long hair, and a teal fish tail instead of legs. In her left hand, she holds a circular yellow (golden) shield covering the right half of her chest, exposing her left breast. In her right hand, she holds a yellow (golden) sword, raised above her head. She is placed on a red background. The top left field features the Polish Air Force checkerboard, a military aircraft insignia of Poland. It has a form of four equal squares, of which the upper left and lower right are white, and the other two are red. These are surrounded by a border of counterchanged colours with the 1/5 of the thickness of a single square. In the coat of arms, it represents the Warsaw Babice Airport, which is located within the district. The bottom left field depicts a white (silver) male cervus (a member of the deer family) with yellow (golden) antlers, placed on a green background. It symbolises the neighbourhood of Jelonki, located within Bemowo, which name in Polish translates to little deers. On the top of the shield is placed a yellow (golden) crown with white (silver) jewels, and a Christian cross at the top.

== Twin towns ==
Bemowo has a twin town cooperation agreement with Óbuda-Békásmegyer, a district of Budapest, Hungary.
