= Urszula Kierzkowska =

Polish politician and jurist (born 1967)

Member of the Masovian Voivodeship Sejmik
- In office 2010–2024

Mayor of Bemowo
- In office 28 November 2018 – 22 May 2024
- Preceded by: Michał Grodzki
- Succeeded by: Grzegorz Kuca

Mayor of Ursus
- In office 8 December 2014 – 28 November 2018
- Prime Minister: Wiesław Krzemień
- Succeeded by: Bogdan Olesiński

Mayor of Wola
- In office 2010–2014
- Preceded by: Marek Andruk
- Succeeded by: Krzysztof Strzałkowski

Mayor of Ursynów
- In office 7 April 2009 – 14 December 2010
- Preceded by: Tomasz Mencina
- Succeeded by: Piotr Guział

Personal details
- Born: 13 October 1967 (age 58) Kraków, Poland
- Party: Civic Platform
- Education: University of Warsaw; Białystok University of Technology; National Defence University of Warsaw
- Occupation: Politician; jurist

Urszula Anna Kierzkowska (Polish: [urˈʂu.la ˈan.na kjɛʂˈkɔf.ska]; born 13 October 1967) is a Polish politician and jurist. From 2010 to 2024, she was also a member of the Masovian Voivodeship Sejmik. Kierzowska also served as a mayor of several city districts of Warsaw, Poland, including Ursynów from 2009 to 2010, Wola from 2010 to 2014, Ursus from 2014 to 2018, and Bemowo from 2018 to 2024. She is a member of the Civic Platform party.

== Biography ==
Urszula Kierzkowska was born on 13 October 1967 in Kraków, Poland. She graduated from the Faculty of Law and Administration of the University of Warsaw, and completed her postgraduate studies in organisation and administration at Białystok University of Technology, and in information security and business administration at the National Defence University of Warsaw. She also completed the legal counsel training at the District Chamber of Legal Advisers.

Kierzowska is a member of the Civic Platform party. From 2006 to 2009, she was the deputy mayor of Wola, one of the city districts in Warsaw, Poland. She left office when she was appointed as the mayor of Ursynów district, after its previous mayor, Tomasz Mencina, was dismissed following a political and legal scandal. She held the office until the 2010 local elections, when she was elected as the mayor of Wola. Later, from 2014 to 2018, she was the mayor of the Ursus district, and from 2018 to 2024, the mayor of the Bemowo district. From 2010 to 2024, she was also a member of the Masovian Voivodeship Sejmik.

== Personal life ==
Kierzowska has a husband.
