= Janów, Warsaw West County =

Janów
- Village
- Location within Poland
- Coordinates: 52°16′0″N 20°50′42″E
- Country: Poland
- Voivodeship: Masovian
- County: Warsaw West
- Gmina: Stare Babice
- Population (2010): 383

Janów [ˈjanuf] is a village in the administrative district of Gmina Stare Babice, within Warsaw West County, Masovian Voivodeship, in east-central Poland.

In 2010, the village had a population of 383.
