= Nowe Górce =

Neighbourhood in Warsaw, Poland

- Neighbourhood
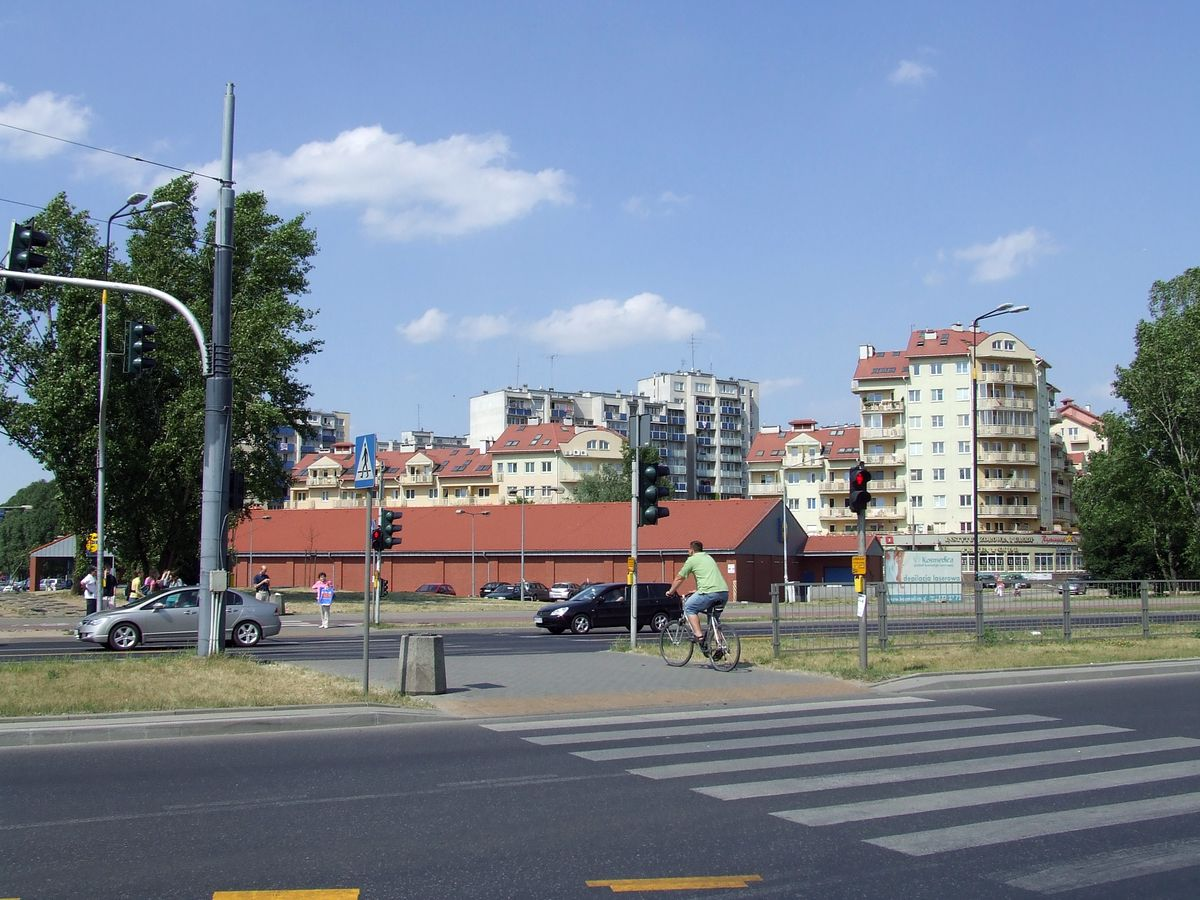
- The corner of Górczewska and Powstańców Śląskich Streets in 2008.
- Interactive map of Nowe Górce
- Coordinates: 52.242730°N 20.917983°E
- Country: Poland
- Voivodeship: Masovian
- City and county: Warsaw
- District: Bemowo
- City Information System area: Górce
- Incorporation into Warsaw: 14 May 1951
- Time zone: UTC+1 (CET)
  - Summer (DST): UTC+2 (CEST)
- Area code: +48 22

Nowe Górce (Polish: [ˈnɔ.vɛ ˈɡur.t͡sɛ]; lit. 'New Górce') is a neighbourhood in the Bemowo district of Warsaw, Poland, in the eastern side of the City Information System area of Górce. It is a high-rise residential area dominated by apartment buildings. The neighbourhood features the Bemowo station of the M2 line of the Warsaw Metro rapid transit underground system.

Górce was founded prior to the 15th century, as a small farming community. It suffered significant damage from the Swedish army during the Second Northern War, recovering in the 17th century, and further developing in the 18th century. Between the 1920s and 1940s, the village became a suburb of Warsaw, with the development of single-family detached homes, and was incorporated into the city in 1951. In the 1980s, the area was crossed by Powstańców Śląskich Street, cutting it into two neighbourhoods, Stare Górce to the west, and Nowe Górce to the east. It began being developed with the housing estates of apartment buildings.

== History ==
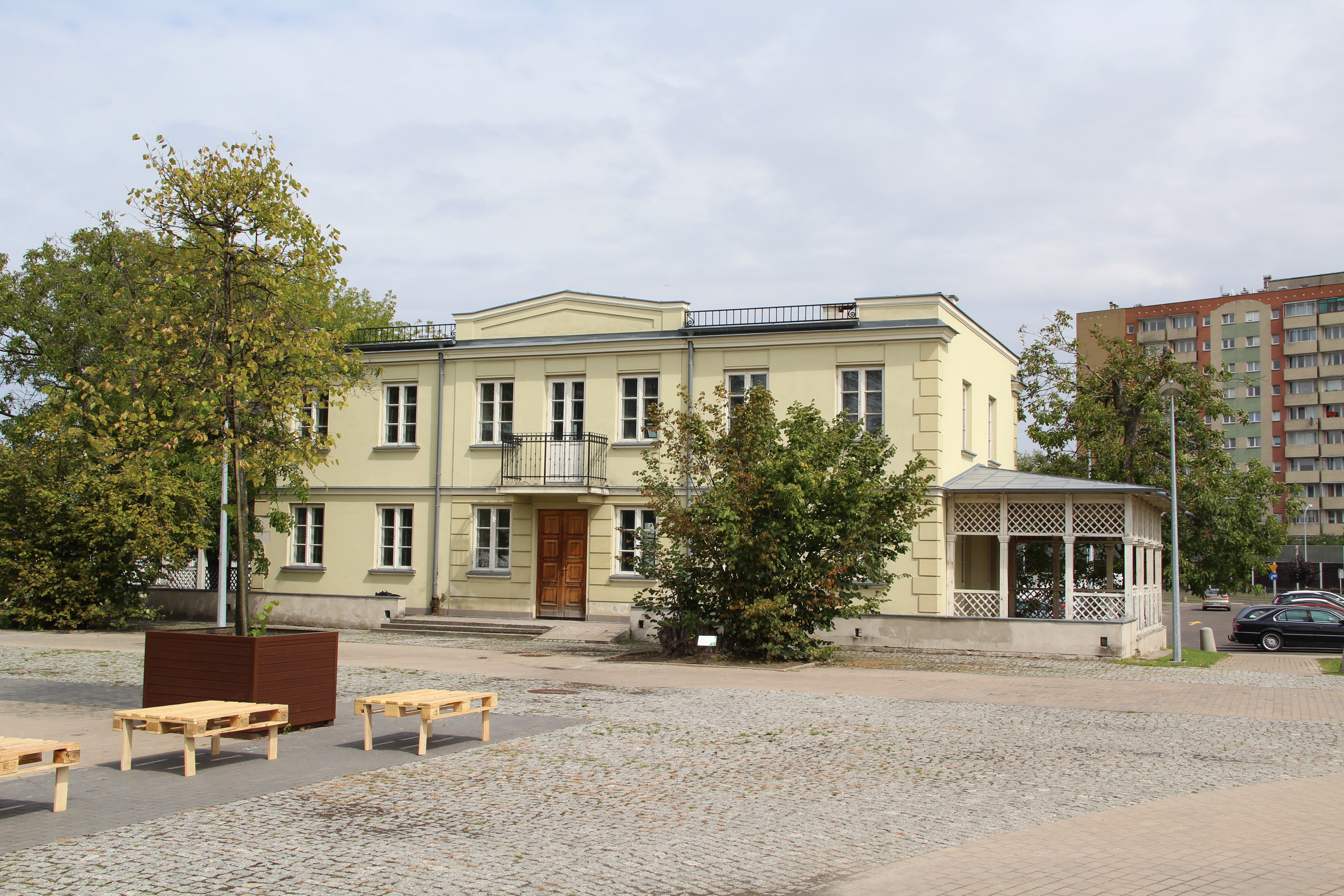
A palace remainding from the former complex of gardening nurcery company Zakłady Ogrodnicze C. Ulrich, at 124 Górczewska Street.

Górce, then a small farming community, was founded before the 15th century, and was at one point owned by a knight. By 1433, it was a property of Piotr Pielgrzym, the advocate of Old Warsaw, and was later inherited by his son, Andrzej Pielgrzymowic, in 1441, who also titled himself as Górczewski. After that, the village changed owners many times, among whom were Mikołaj Kazuba, the Zdziarski family, treasurer of Sochaczew Szymanowski, captain of the Crown Army Malinowski, and voivode of Smolensk Piotr Paweł Sapieha. By the 16th century, it was inhabited by the petty nobility. The village belonged to the Catholic parish in Stare Babice.

In 1587, Jan Zamoyski, the supporter of Sigismund III Vasa in the War of the Polish Succession, fortified with his fources at the fields near Górce, during the opening stages of the conflict.

Górce suffered significant damage from the Swedish army during the Second Northern War, and recovered in the 17th century. It developed further in the 18th century, partially thanks to the proceedings of the election seym, during which nobility members elected monarchs of the Polish–Lithuanian Commonwealth, held at the nearby fields of Młynów, Koło, and Powązki. Górce provided the attendees and the staff with housing and food. At that time, the village also housed the residence of a politician and military officer Adam Poniński, and the road to the settlement was regulated from his initiative around 1775.

In 1827, Górce had a population of 282 people in 38 households. In 1867, its lands were split and incorporated into the municipalities of Młociny and Powązki. They were organised into two agricultural estates, designated as A and B. The first was state-owned with an area of 516 New Polish morgen (288.86 ha), and the latter had an area of 500 New Polish morgen (279.9 ha). In 1876, a plot of land in the village, near the current Górczewska Street, was bought by Jan Krystian Ulrich, who then founded there a plantation complex, with plant nurseries, greenhouses and a show garden, managed by his family company Zakłady Ogrodnicze C. Ulrich. Currently, it is located within the boundaries of the nearby neighbourhood of Koło. The area became known after him as Ulrychów Several brickworks also developed in the area, with the largest being Bogumił Schneider's factory in the nearby Jelonki.

In the 1920s, Górce became a suburb of Warsaw, with its lands being sold for the development of a low-rise neighbourhood with single-family detached homes. In 1933, the village had 80 households, concentrated in the area of the current Górczewska, Siodlarska, Żeńców, Marynin, and Gromadzka Streets. Górce survived the Second World War without major damage. During the conflict, and in its aftermath, the village rapidly developed with new housing, with people moving three after having their homes destroyed in Warsaw. Most of the new buildings were provisional structures built from wood or rubble recovered from destruction in the city. In 1950, a tram line was opened, forming a connection between Boernerowo with Koło and Ulrychów, partially crossing the current boundaries of Górce, via Dywizjonu 303 Street.

On 14 May 1951 the area was incorporated into the city of Warsaw, becoming part of the Wola district. On 29 December 1989, following an administrative reform in the city, it became part of the municipality of Warsaw-Wola, and on 25 March 1994, of the municipality of Warsaw-Bemowo, which, on 27 October 2002, was restructured into the city district of Bemowo.

In the 1980s, the area was cut vertically in the middle by Powstańców Śląskich Street, forming a boundary of two neighbourhoods, Stare Górce (Old Górce) to the west, and Nowe Górce (New Górce) to the east. The western side begun to be developed with housing estates of high-rise apartment buildings, replacing old residential structures. In 1992, a tram line was built alongside Górczewska Street, as part of the line connecting Górce to the Wola Cemetery. In 1997, it was expanded further to the north along Powstańców Śląskich Street, connecting to the neighbourhood of Nowe Bemowo.

In 1991, the St. Luke the Evangelist Church of the Catholic denomination was opened at 173 Górczewska Street, based in a wooden chapel. It burned down on 24 September 2004. A new temporary chapel was built in 2004, while the construction of a new church building has been ongoing since 2001.

Between 2008 and 2011, a fragment of the Expressway S8, in the form of Obrońców Grodna Avenue, was constructed to the north of the neighbourhood.

In 2022, the Bemowo station of the M2 line of the Warsaw Metro rapid transit underground system, was opened at the corner of Górczewska and Powstańców Śląskich Streets.

== Overview ==
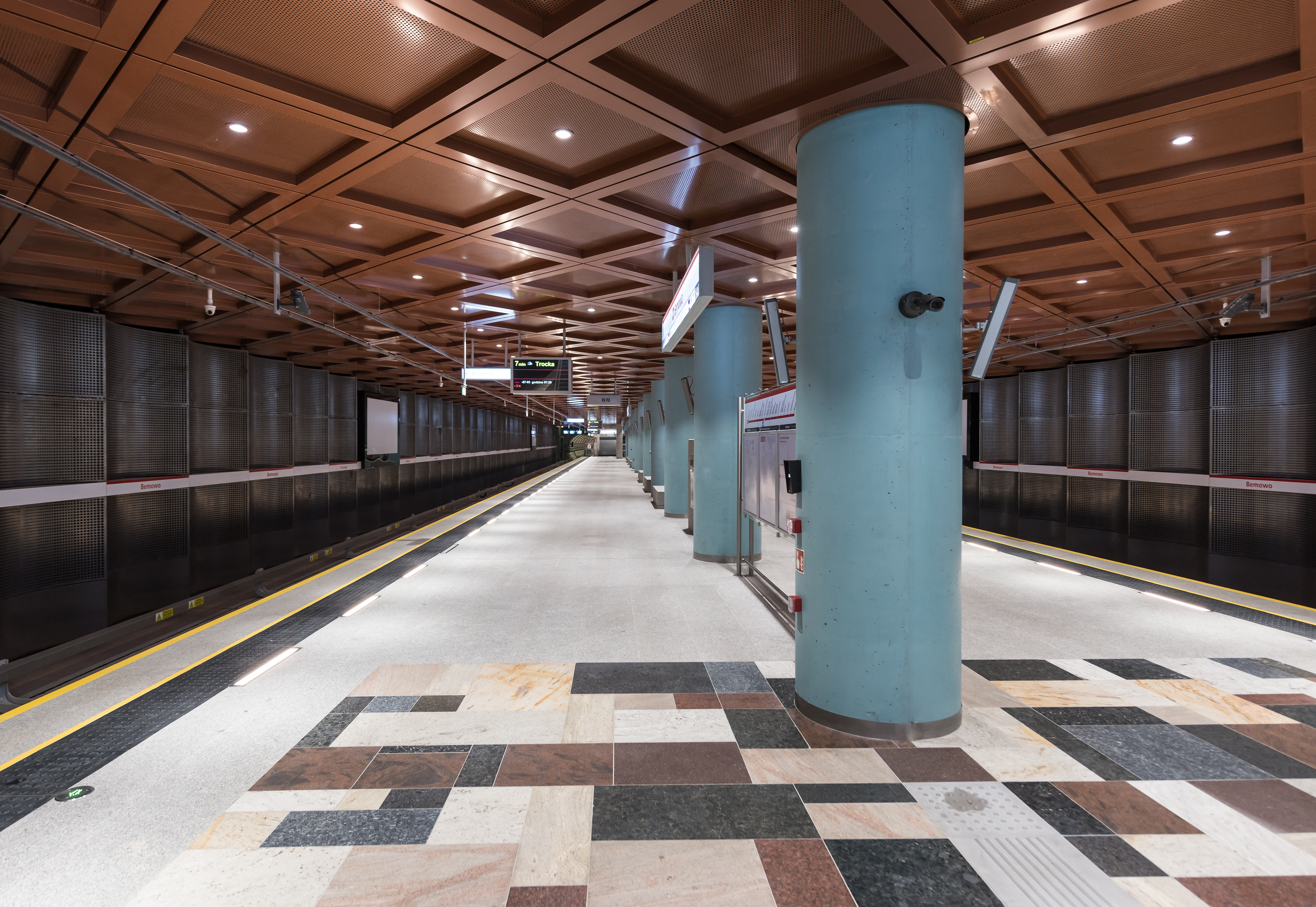
The Bemowo metro station.

Nowe Górce is a residential neighbourhood dominated by mid-rise apartment buildings. It includes the Bemowo station of the M2 line of the Warsaw Metro rapid transit underground system, at the corner of Górczewska and Powstańców Śląskich Streets. It also has three tramlines with tracks alongside Powstańców Śląskich Street, and Dywizjonu 303 Street. Additionally, the area features the St. Luke the Evangelist Church of the Catholic at 173 Górczewska Street.

== Boundaries ==
The neighbourhood boundaries are approximately determined by Obrońców Grodna Avenue to the north, railway tracks to the east, Górczewska Street to the south, and Powstańców Śląskich Street to the west.
