= Groty =

Neighbourhood in Warsaw, Poland

- City Information System area (neighbourhood)
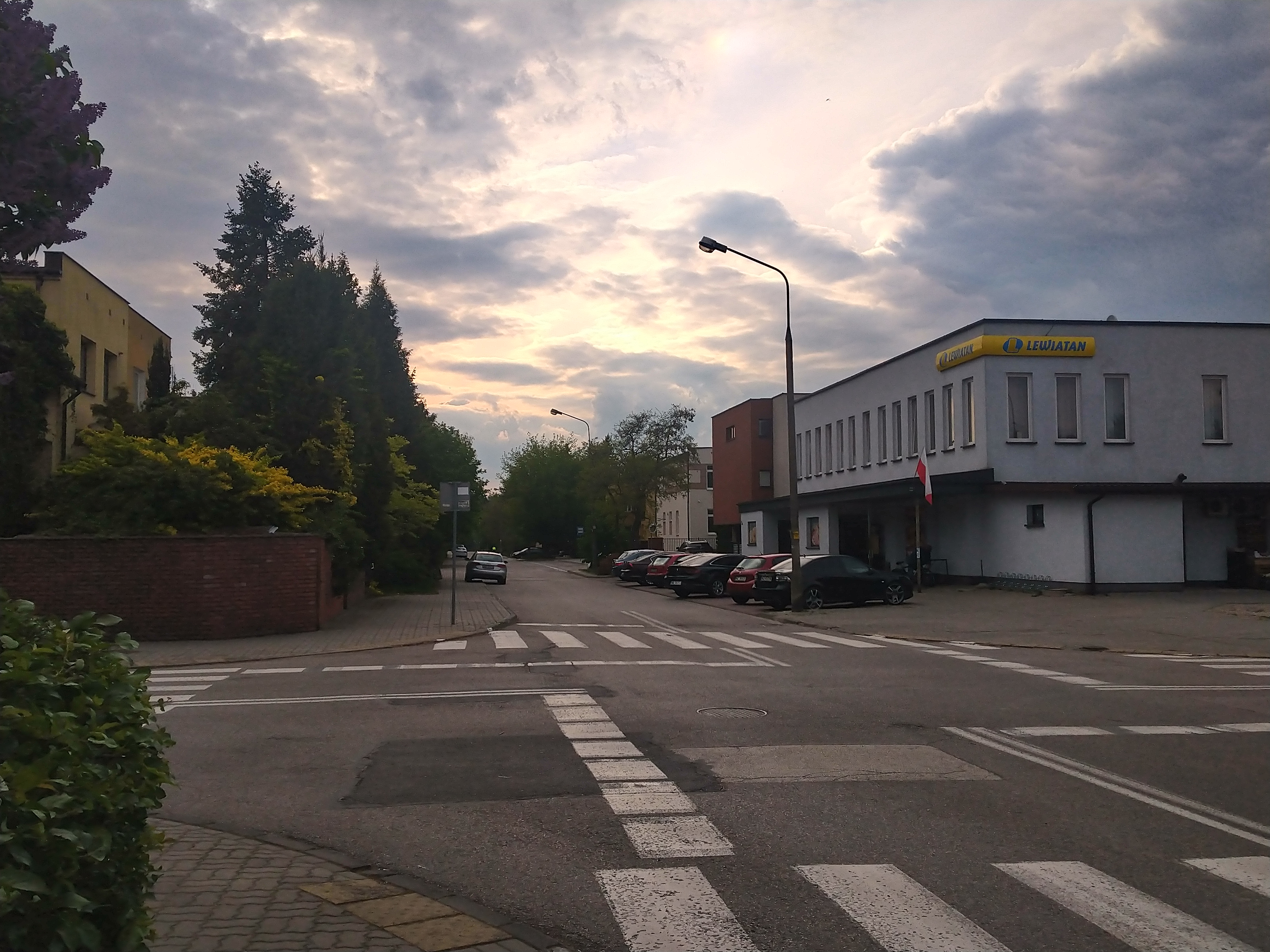
- The corner of Podkowińska and Spychowska Street in Groty, in 2020.

- The location of the City Information System area of Groty within the district of Bemowo
- Coordinates: 52.249470°N 20.881475°E
- Country: Poland
- Voivodeship: Masovian
- City and county: Warsaw
- District: Bemowo
- Incorporation into Warsaw: 14 May 1951
- Time zone: UTC+1 (CET)
  - Summer (DST): UTC+2 (CEST)
- Area code: +48 22

Groty (Polish: [ˈɡrɔ.tɘ̟]) is a neighbourhood and City Information System area in the Bemowo district of Warsaw, Poland. It is a residential area with mostly low-rise housing.

The oldest known records of Groty, then a small farming community, dates to 1462. The village was destroyed between 1655 and 1656 by the Swedish army during the Second Northern War, and rebuilt afterwards. It was incorporated into the city in 1951, and in the 1970s, low-rise housing estates had developed in its area.

== Toponomy ==
The name Groty comes from Grot of Moszyny, a landowner who acquired the settlement in the 15th century. His family name Grot, meaning arrowhead in Polish, came from their occupation as arrowhead makers. In the 14th century, before being acquired by Grot of Moszyny, the settlement was known as Wyczółkowo or Wyczółki, being recorded as such in 1462 and 1474 respectively. In 1580, its name was recorded as Wyczółki-Groty.

== History ==
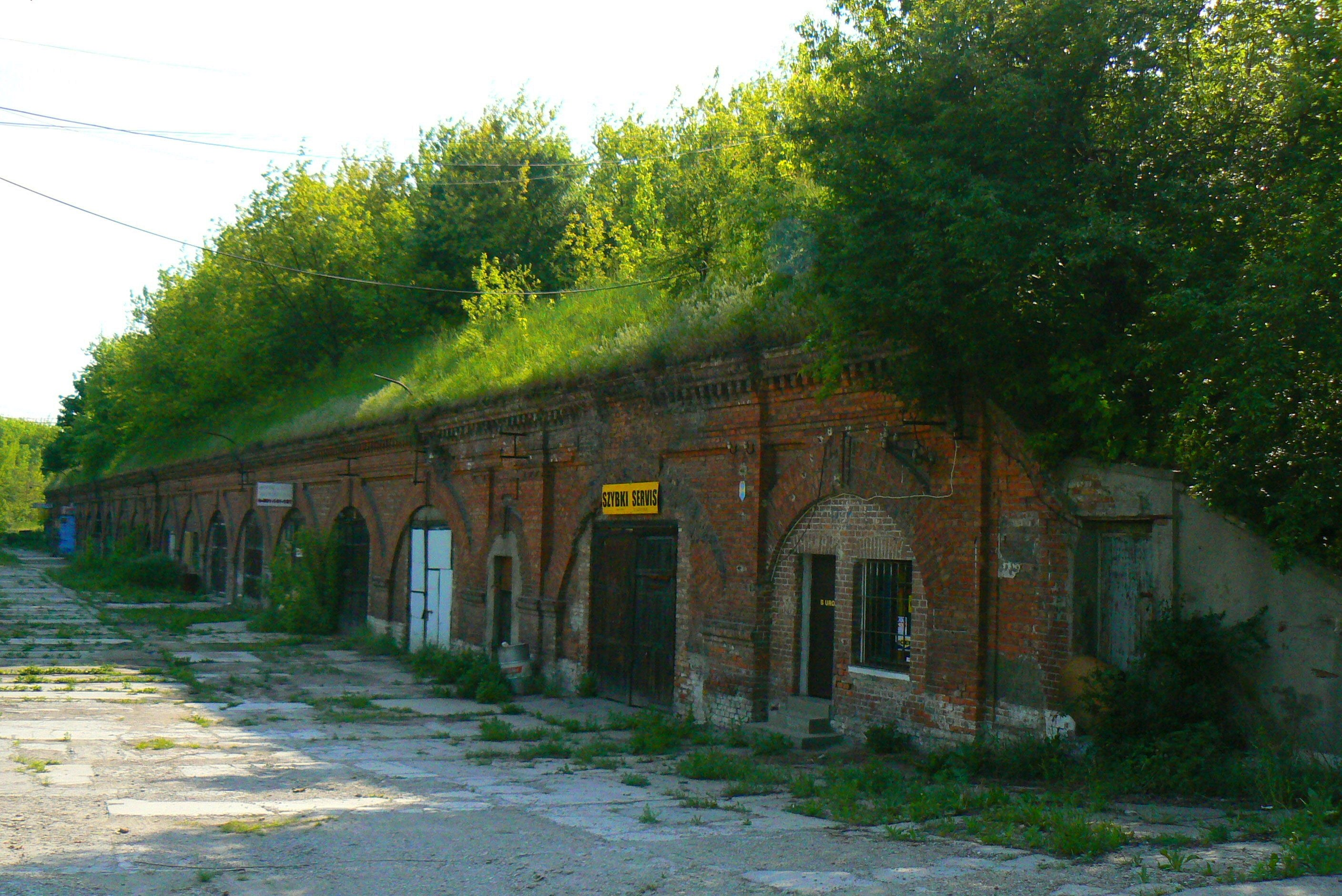
The Fort III Blizne, built in Groty in 1868.

The oldest known record of the village, then noted as Wyczółkowo, comes from 1462. Later, it was also recorded as Wyczółki in 1474, and Wyczółki-Groty in 1580. It was originally a small farming community, inhabited by petty nobility, and owned by Mikołaj of Latchorzew. In the 15th century, it was bought by Grot of Moszyny, whom became the namesake of the settlement. It continued to be onwed by the Grot family, and later, became property of the Zdziarski family.

In the 16th century, Groty was a small farming community, owned by the Grot and Zdziarski families, which were members of the petty nobility. It had an area of 3 lans, or around 77 ha. The village was completely destroyed between 1655 and 1656 by the Swedish army during the Second Northern War, and rebuilt afterwards.

In 1866, the Fort III Blizne was built near the corner of the current Lazurowa and Kocjana Streets. It was part of the series of fortifications of the Warsaw Fortress, built around the city by the Imperial Russian Army. The fort was decommissioned and partially demolished in 1913.

In 1868, Groty had 13 households and an area of around 22 ha, and included an adjusted farming estate of around 200 ha. In 1868, the residence of banker Jan Gotlib Bloch, designed by Władysław Marconi, was built at the corner of current Lazurowa and Narwik Streets. It also included a park with an area of around 25 ha. It was demolished in 1959.

In 1877, the village had 157 residents in 13 households. In 1904, it had 325 residents, and by then, its farming estate was reduced to 70 ha, with most of its land sold for housing development. Until 1939, in the village operated Dr. Józef Twerski's Medical and Educational Complex, providing care for severely disabled children.

Between 1922 and 1923, several base transceiver station towers of the broadcast station of the Transatlantic Radiotelegraph Exchange were built in Bemowo Woods to the east of Groty. During the Second World War, on 16 January 1945, they were destroyed by retreating German forces.

In the early September 1939, during the Siege of Warsaw, the commander of the Polish Armed Forces, unit, stationed at the Fort III, ordered its soldiers to abandon it, without resisting the advancing German Wehrmacht forces, for which he was later tried in the drumhead court-martial. In the morning of 19 September, the Capital Battalion of the Polish Armed Forces, led by Józef Spychalski, began an attack on the German-occupied fort, from the village of Blizne Łaszczyńskiego. It was aided by the 8th Company of the 26th Infantry Regiment, attacking from Osiedle Łączności in the north. The German forces pushed back two attacks, causing significant casualties to the Polish side, which fortified its positions 500 metres from the fort. The fort was abandoned and captured on 26 September.

On 14 May 1951, the area was incorporated into the city of Warsaw, becoming part of the Wola district. On 29 December 1989, following an administrative reform in the city, it became part of the municipality of Warsaw-Wola, and on 25 March 1994, of the municipality of Warsaw-Bemowo, which, on 27 October 2002, was restructured into the city district of Bemowo.

Between 1970 and 1975, a low-rise housing estate, designed by Andrzej Rogowski, was built between Kocjana, Bolimowska, Dobrzańskiego, Podkowińska, and Spychowska Streets. It consisted of detached terraced houses and had an area of 21 ha. Between 1975 and 1979, another low-rise housing estate of semi-detached houses, designed by Leszek Studnicki, was developed between Dobrzańskiego, Podkowińska, Spychowska, and Zaboreczne Strees. It had an area of 9.1 ha.

In 1997, the Bemowo district was subdivided into ten areas of the City Information System, with Groty becoming one of them.

Since 2020, a building at 3 Kocjana Street hosts the Imka Theatre, owned by actor Tomasz Karolak.

== Overview ==
Groty is a residential neighbourhood, mostly dominated by low-rise housing. In the east, at the corner of Lazurowa and Kocjana Streets, it includes the Fort III Blizne, a historic and decommissioned fortification built in 1866. The western portion of the neighbourhood, beyond Spychowska Street, is covered by a part of the Bemowo Woods. Additionally, a building at 3 Kocjana Street hosts the Imka Theatre, owned by actor Tomasz Karolak.

== Boundaries ==
Groty is a City Information System area located in Warsaw, Poland, within the central western portion of the district of Bemowo. Its boundaries are approximately determined by Kocjana Street to the north, Lazurowa Street to the east, tracks of the railway line no. 938, Fortowa Street, Dobrzańskiego Street, and the city boundaries to the west.

The neighbourhood borders Fort Radiowo to the north, Górce to the east, Jelonki Północne and Chrzanów to the south, and the municipality of Stare Babice, with the villages of Blizne Łaszczyńskiego and Latchorzew. Its western and southern boundaries mark the city border with the Warsaw West County.
