= Koło, Warsaw =

Neighbourhood in Warsaw, Poland

Koło
- Neighbourhood and City Information System area
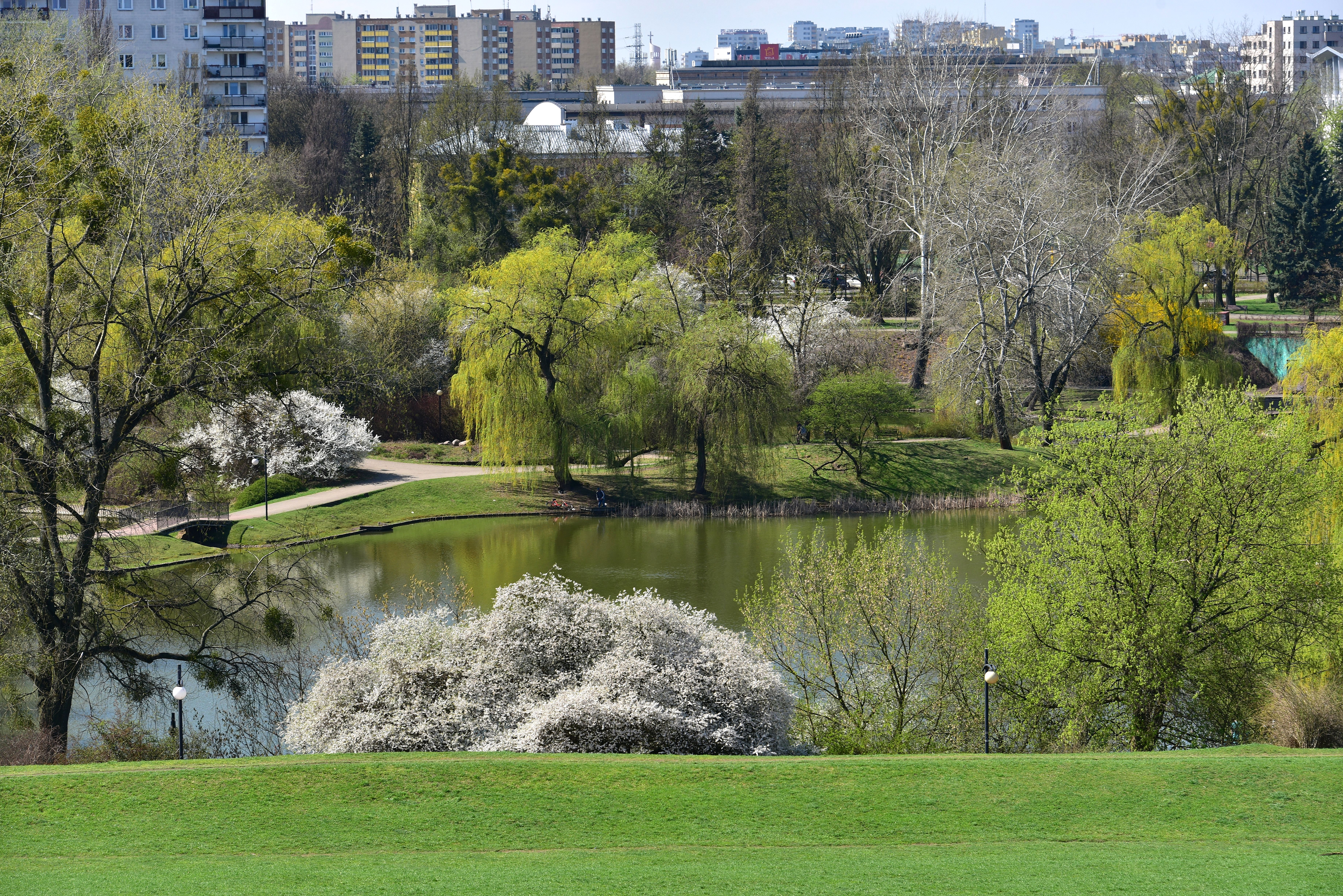
- The Moczydło Park in Koło in 2018.

- The location of the City Information System area of Koło within the district of Wola
- Coordinates: 52.2451°N 20.9456°E
- Country: Poland
- Voivodeship: Masovian
- City and county: Warsaw
- District: Wola
- Time zone: UTC+1 (CET)
  - Summer (DST): UTC+2 (CEST)
- Area code: +48 22

Koło (Polish pronunciation: [ˈkɔwɔ]) is a neighbourhood and an area of the City Information System in Warsaw, Poland, within the district of Wola. It is a residential area, with a mixture of single- and multifamily housing.

== History ==
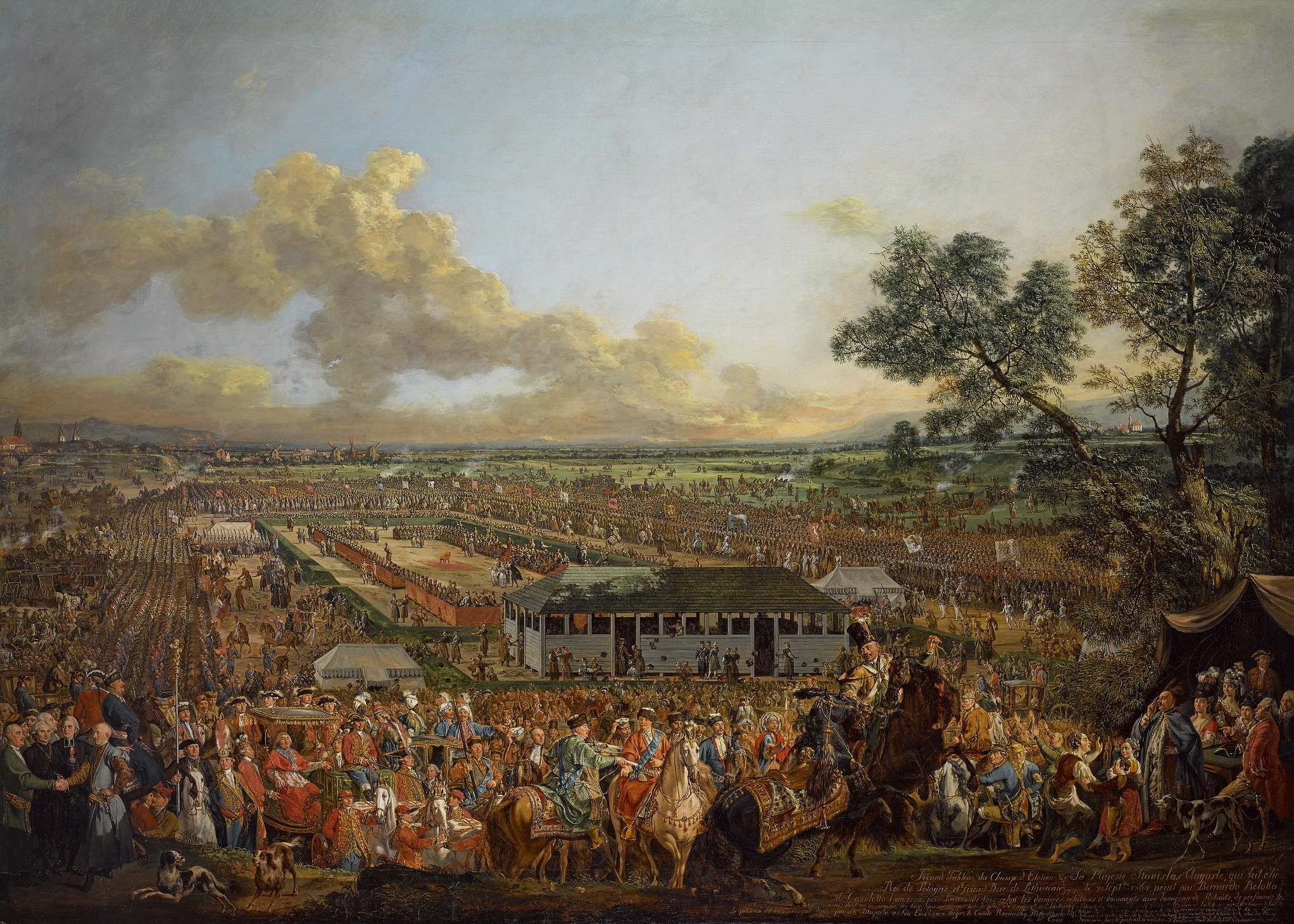
The Election of Stanisław August, a 1778 painting by Bernardo Bellotto, depicting the 1764 royal election of king Stanisław August Poniatowski, which took place in Koło.

In 1575, the fields, currently within boundaries of neighbourhoods of Młynów, Koło, and Powązki, were set up as the location for the proceedings of the election seym, during which nobility members elected the monarch of the Polish–Lithuanian Commonwealth. The first proceedings lasted from November to October 1575, when Anna Jagiellon and Stephen Báthory were chosen as the co-rulers. Between the 16th and 18th centuries, nine more rulers were chosen there. The last election was hosted in 1764, when Stanisław August Poniatowski was chosen as the ruler. The area of Koło, at the road leading from Warsaw to Sochaczew, became the location of the Kight Circle (Polish: Koło Rycerskie), an assembly of nobility members. It gave name to the neighbourhood, with the term koło translating from Polish to circle.

In 1876, agricultural company Zakłady Ogrodnicze C. Ulrich, owned by Jan Krystian Ulrich, opened a plantation with greenhouses near Górczewska Street, growing rare species of fruits, vegetables, and flowers. It was placed near the village of Górce. The company was nationalized in 1958, and was later returned in 1996. Currently, a small part of the former complex forms Urlich Park, which was renovated in 2022, together with greenhouses, which are now used as store and restaurant spaces.

At the end of the 19th century, nearby, at the current intersection of Górczewska and Primate of Millennium Avenue was also opened a brickwork owned by the company Kohen i Oppenheim, run by Isser Kohen and Uszer Oppenheim. It operated until 1939, when it was sold to the city the same year. The operation left behind clay pits, which were later flooded forming four small ponds.

On 8 April 1916, the area east of Księcia Janusza Street was incorporated into Warsaw. The rest of Koło was incorporated into the city on 15 May 1951.

During the interwar period, in the area of current Koło, were developed two multifamily residential neighborhoods, owned by the Association of the Workers' Neighbourhoods, and the National Development Bank. Additionally, in the north, swamps around the Rudawka river, were planted with trees, forming the Koło Woods.

In 1938, at 41 Deotymy Street, was begun the construction of the Catholic St. Joseph the Spouse of St. Mary and St. John of the Cross Church, which eventually opened in 1963.

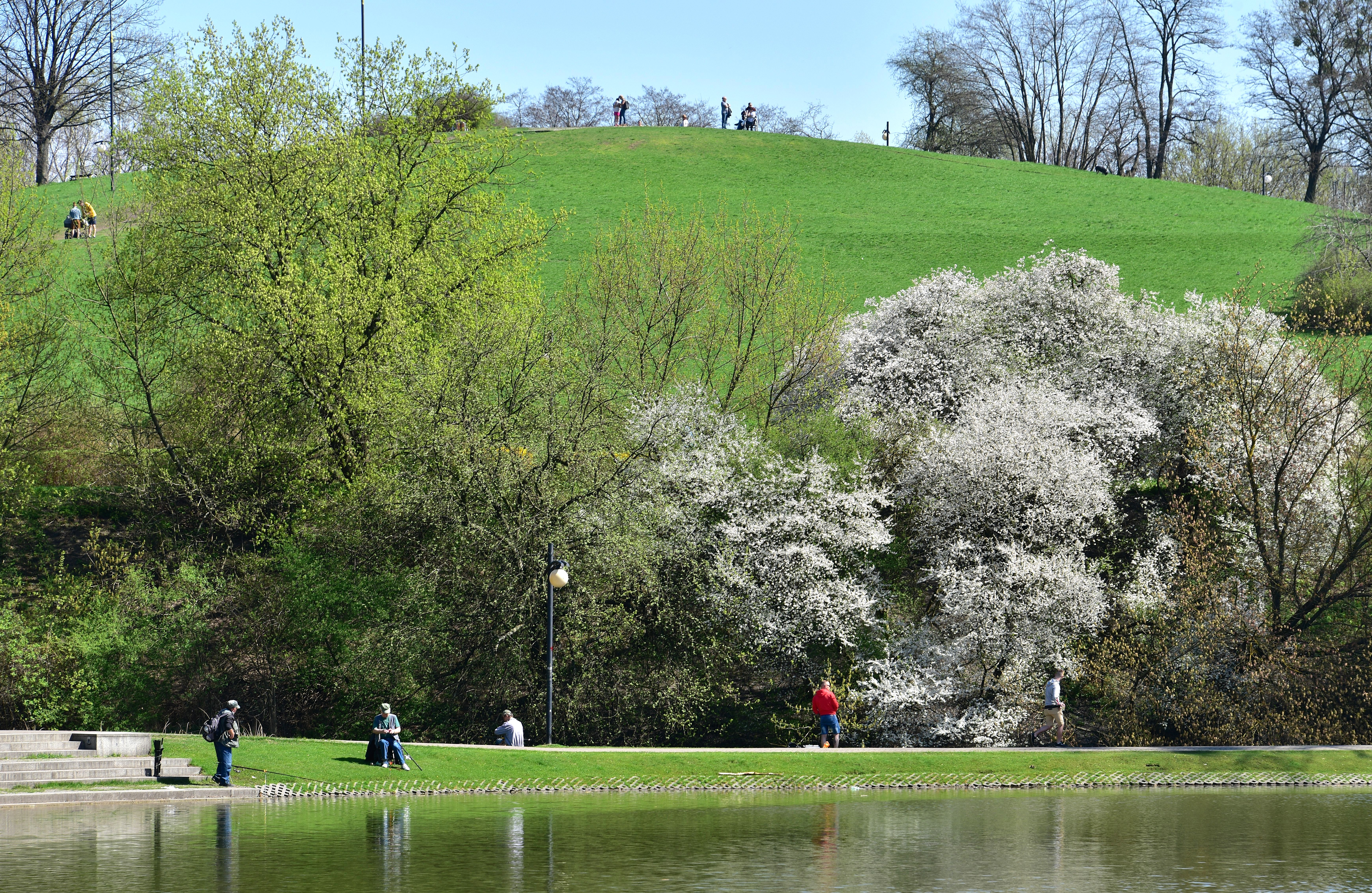
The Moczydło Mound formed in the 1940s.

Following the end of the Second World War, beginning in the 1940s, five multifamily residential neighborhoods were developed in the area. During that time was also formed the Moczydło Mound, an artificial hill, with a height of 130.5 m, made from the rubble of destroyed buildings, brought from all around the city. In the 1960s, it was covered in dirt and was also developed the Moczydło Park, which also included the Olimpia Sports Club complex.

On 3 September 1948, while visiting Warsaw, artist Pablo Picasso drew an illustration on a wall of one of the new apartment units, in the building at 4 Sitnika Street (then 48 Deotymy Street). Made with coal on a white wall, the minimalist mural depicted a mermaid, a symbol of the city, holding a hammer and a shield. While the apartment was assigned to a family, it became an attraction visited by numerous tourists, art enthusiasts, and students. Eventually, tired of constant visitors, the residents had it painted over by a contractor. In 2019, it was recreated in the original location, though made with black acrylic paint.

In 1952, at 64 Księcia Janusza Street, was opened the Institute of Geophysics of the Polish Academy of Sciences.

In 1988, near Sokołowska Street was opened the Warszawa Koło railway station. In 2018, it was renovated and renamed to Warszawa Młynów. At the same time, farther to the north, near Obozowa Street, was opened the station named Warszawa Koło.

In 1996, the district of Wola was subdivided into eight areas of the City Information System, a municipal standardized street signage system. Koło became one of them, additionally including area historically associated with neighbouring Ulrychów.

In 2002, at 124 Górczewska Street, was opened the Wola Park shopping centre. It was built in place of the former complex of Zakłady Ogrodnicze C. Ulrich.

In 2020, at the intersection of Górczewska and Księcia Janusza Streets, was opened Księcia Janusza station of the M2 line of the Warsaw Metro rapid transit underground system.

== Overview ==
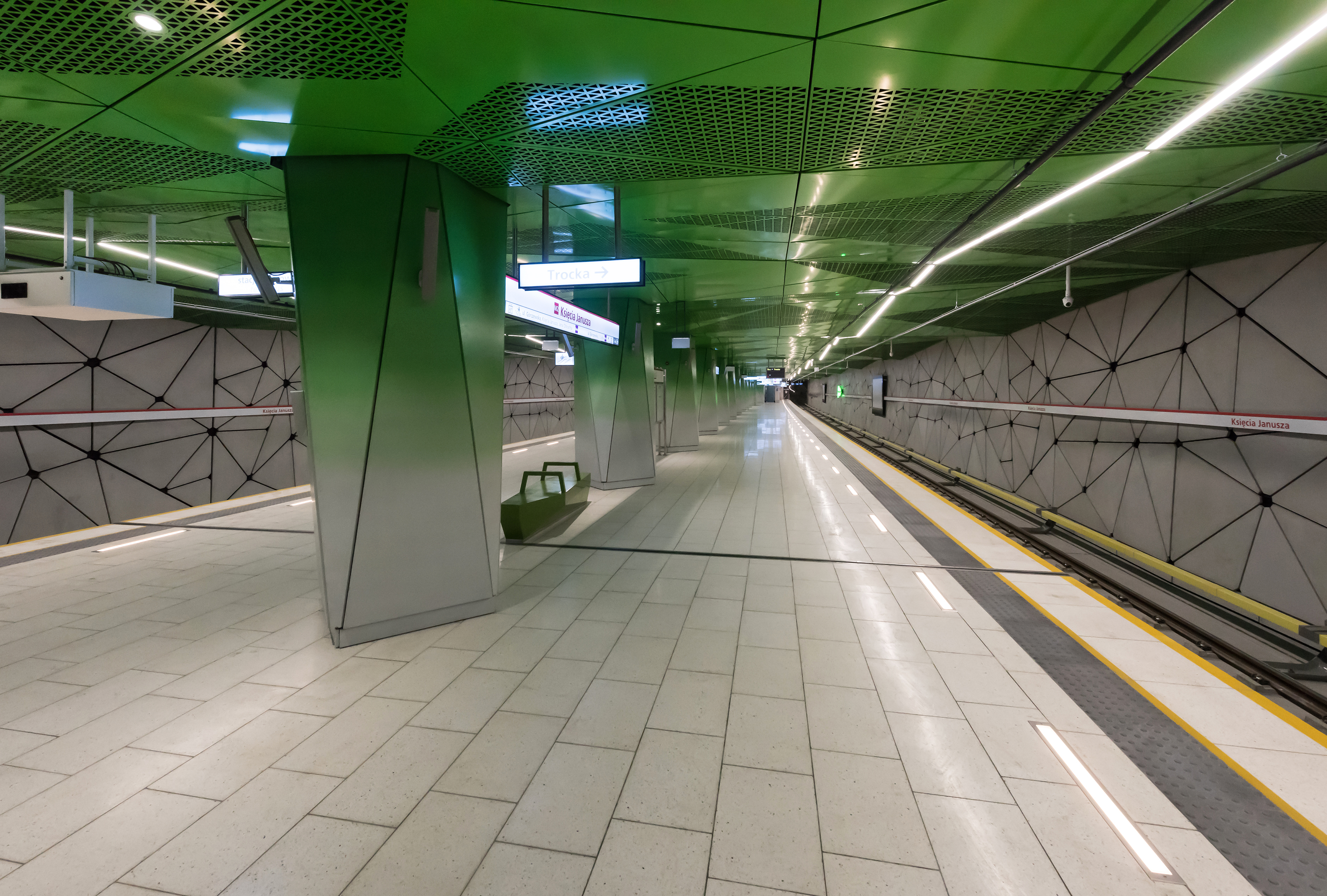
The Księcia Janusza metro station in 2020.

Koło is a residential area of mixed high-rise multifamily and low-rise single-family housing. The area features the Moczydło Park and Ulrich Parks at Górczewska Street, and Duke Janush Park at Księcia Janusza Street. The first of the three listed also includes the Moczydło Mound, an artificial hill with a height of 130.5 m above sea level. The Koło Woods are in the north of the neighbourhood.

The neighbourhood also includes the Wola Park shopping centre at 124 Górczewska Street, the Institute of Geophysics of the Polish Academy of Sciences at 64 Księcia Janusza Street, and Catholic St. Joseph the Spouse of St. Mary and St. John of the Cross Church at 41 Deotymy Street.

In the area are also located two railway stations of the Polish State Railways. They are Warszawa Młynów near Sokołowska Street and Warszawa Koło near Obozowa Street. Additionally, at the corner of Górczewska and Księcia Janusza Streets is the Księcia Janusza station of the M2 line of the Warsaw Metro rapid transit underground system.

Additionally, from 1948 to 1953, an apartment in a residential building at 48 Deotymy Street featured a mural by Pablo Picasso. It depicted a minimalist mermaid, a symbol of the city, holding a hammer and a shield. Currently, a replica is displayed in its place.

== Location and administrative boundaries ==
Koło is one of the City Information System areas, located in the northwestern part of the district of Wola. Its boundary is determined by Górczewska Street, tracks of the railway line no. 20 and 509, Defenders of Grodno Avenue, north border of Koło Woods, and the border with the district of Żoliborz. It borders Sady Żoliborskie to the north, Młynów and Powązki to the east, Ulrychów to the south, Jelonki Południowe to the southwest, and Górce and Fort Bema to the west. Its western and northern boundaries form the border of Wola, bordering districts of Bemowo and Żoliborz.
