= Moczydło Park =

Urban park in Warsaw, Poland

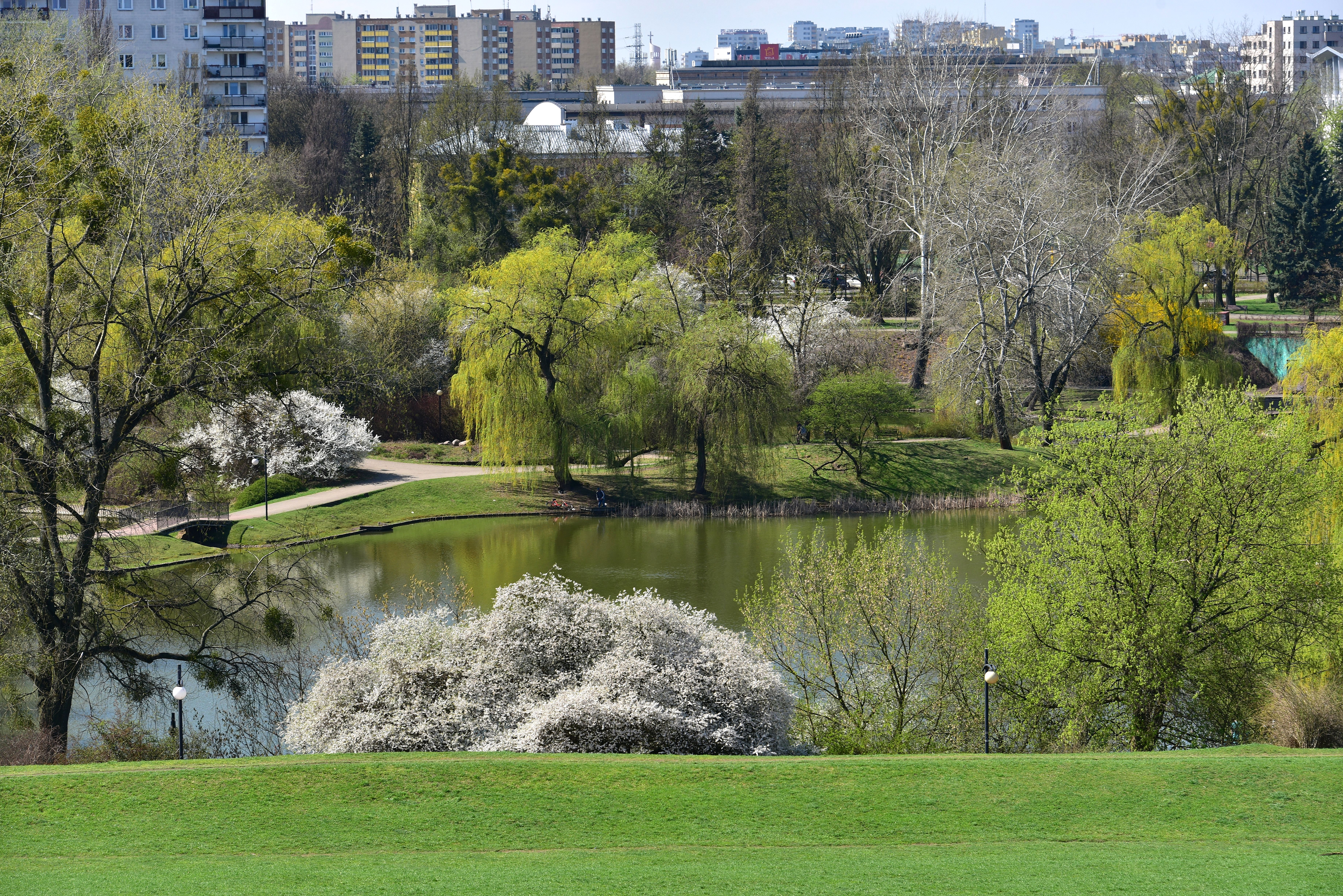
- One of the ponds of Moczydło Park in 2018.
- Interactive map of Moczydło Park
- Type: Urban park
- Location: Wola, Warsaw, Poland
- Coordinates: 52°14′24.00″N 20°57′07.19″E
- Area: 20 hectares (49 acres)
- Created: 1960s
- Designer: Maria Szczypiorska; Alina Scholtz

The Moczydło Park (Polish pronunciation: [mɔˈt͡ʂɘ̟.dwɔ]; Polish: Park Moczydło) is an urban park in Warsaw, Poland, within the district of Wola. It is located in the neighbourhood of Koło, between Deotymy, Górczewska, and Czorsztyńska Streers, and Primate of the Millennium Avenue. It was developed in the 1960s.

== Historia ==
At the end of the 19th century, within the area of the current park, was opened a brickwork owned by the company Kohen i Oppenheim, run by Isser Kohen and Uszer Oppenheim. It was placed at t 5 Cegielna Street, near the current intersection of Górczewska and Primate of the Millennium Avenue. After the death of its owner, Oppenheim in 1930, it continued to operate with Stanisław Grosman in charge. It was shut down in 1939, and bought by the city the same year, before the outbreak of the Second World War. The operation left behind clay pits, which were later flooded forming four small ponds.

After the conflict, the area featured ponds, landfills, and ruins of tenement houses. Local school students, residents, and employees cleaned it up as part of the weekly Saturday civil conscription program. The Moczydło Mound was formed there, made from the rubble of destroyed buildings brought from around the city.

In the 1960s, the area was developed into a park, designed by Maria Szczypiorska and Alina Scholtz, as a recreational area for new neighborhoods built nearby. This included the construction of a sports complex for the Olimia Sports Club, in place of the former brickwork. Additionally, the Moczydło Mound was covered in dirt and there was installed a T-bar ski lift.

In 2001, in the southwestern part of the park was unveiled a sculpture Christ of Divine Mercy by Gustaw Zemła.

In 2009, Narcyza Żmichowska Street, a former road, and by then a park pathway, was renamed to Żmichowska Avenue, to better reflect its contemporary function.

== Overview ==
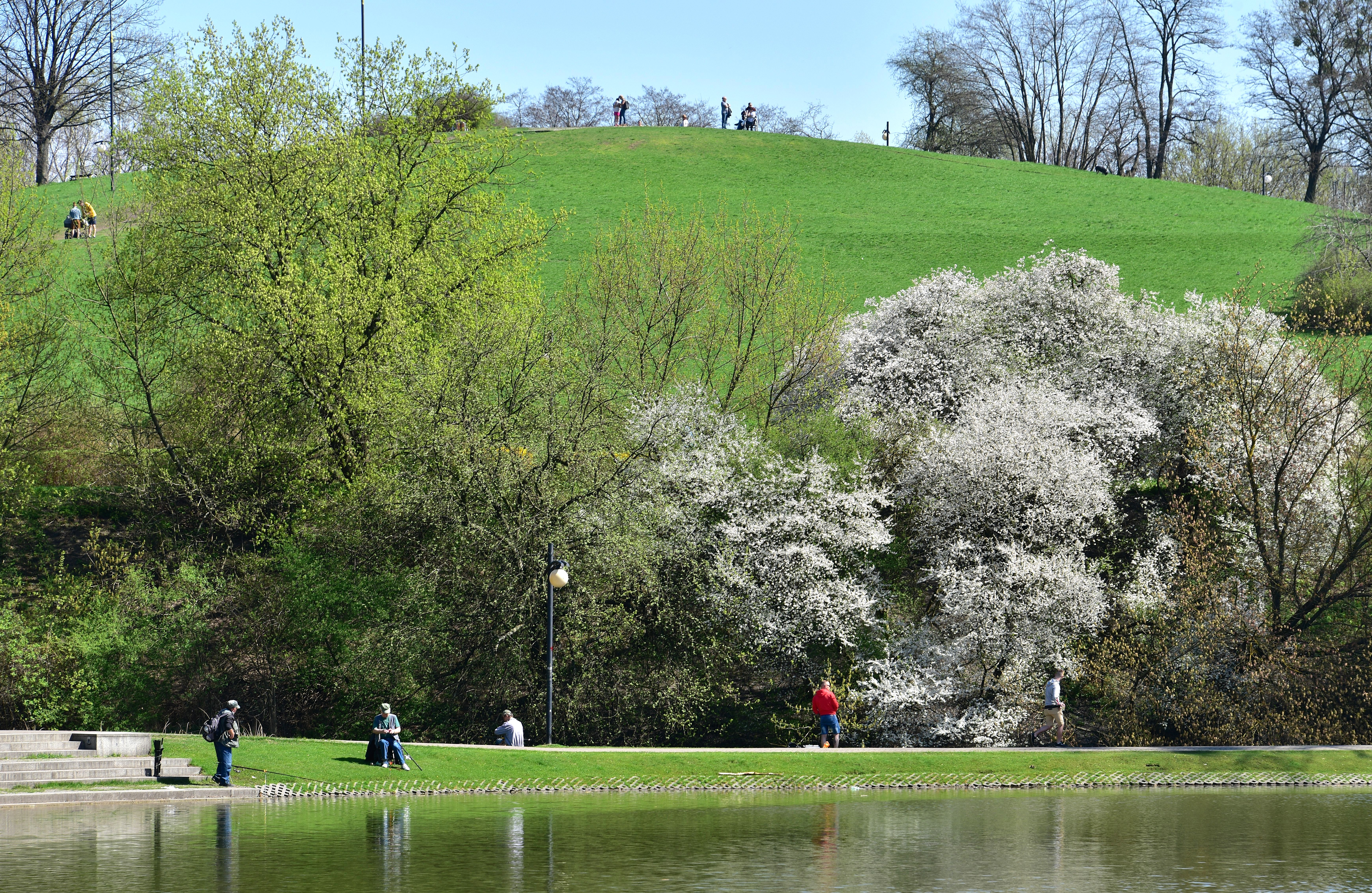
The Moczydło Mound in 2018.

The park is located between Deotymy Street, Górczewska Street, Czorsztyńska Street, and Primate of the Millennium Avenue, and has an area of around 20 ha. The park contains four ponds, the complex of the Olimpia Sports Club, including an association football pitch, and the Moczydło Mound with a height of 130.5 m above sea level, which features a T-bar ski lift. The park also features the sculpture Jesus Christ of Divine Mercy by Gustaw Zemła.

The Moczydło Waterpark (Polish: Park Wodny Moczydło), is located to the south, on the other side of Górczewska Street, featuring several swimming pools, a 70-metre-tall slide, volleyball courts, and an ice rink in winter.

== Gallery ==
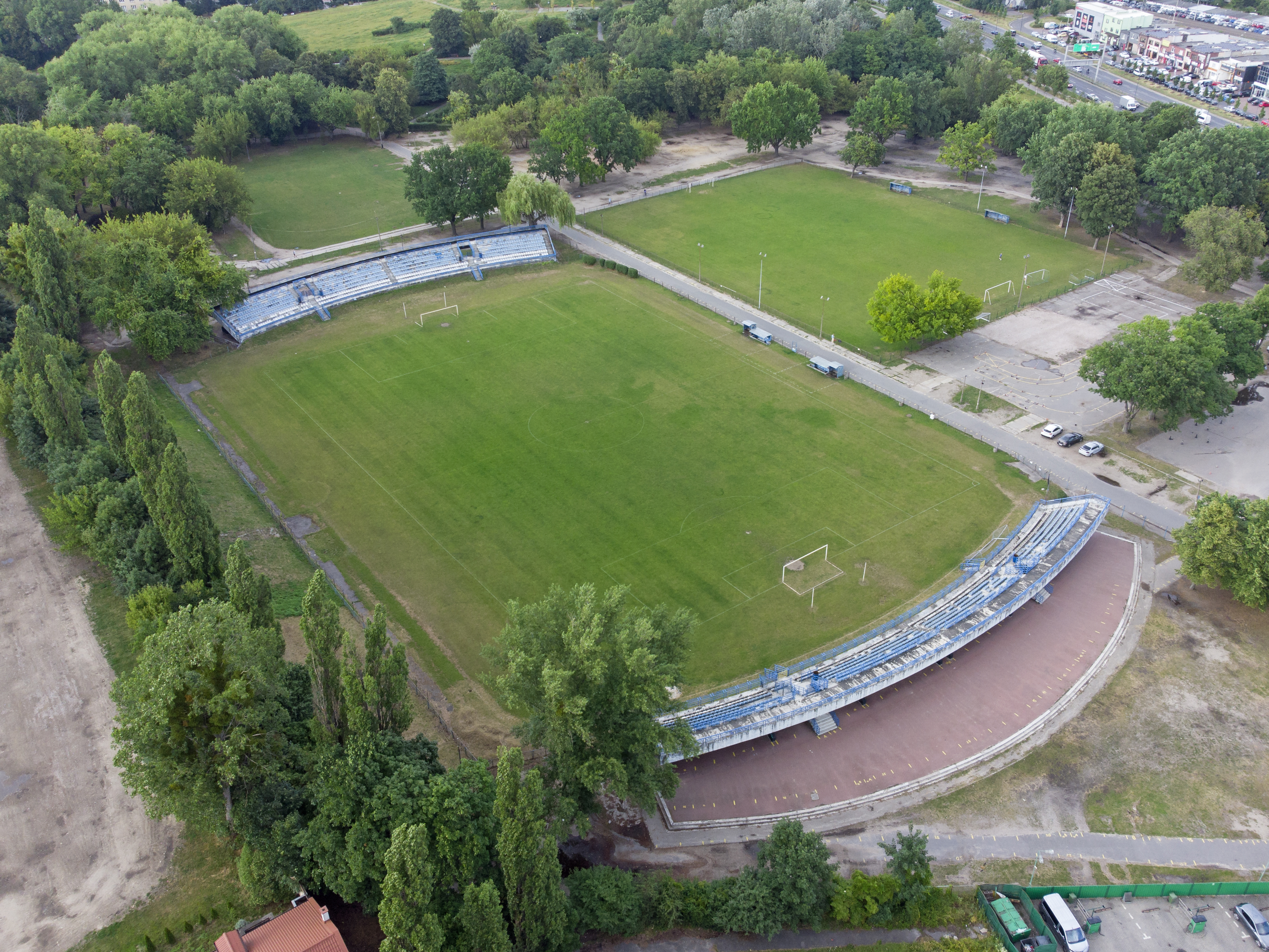
An association football pitch of the Olimpia Sports Club

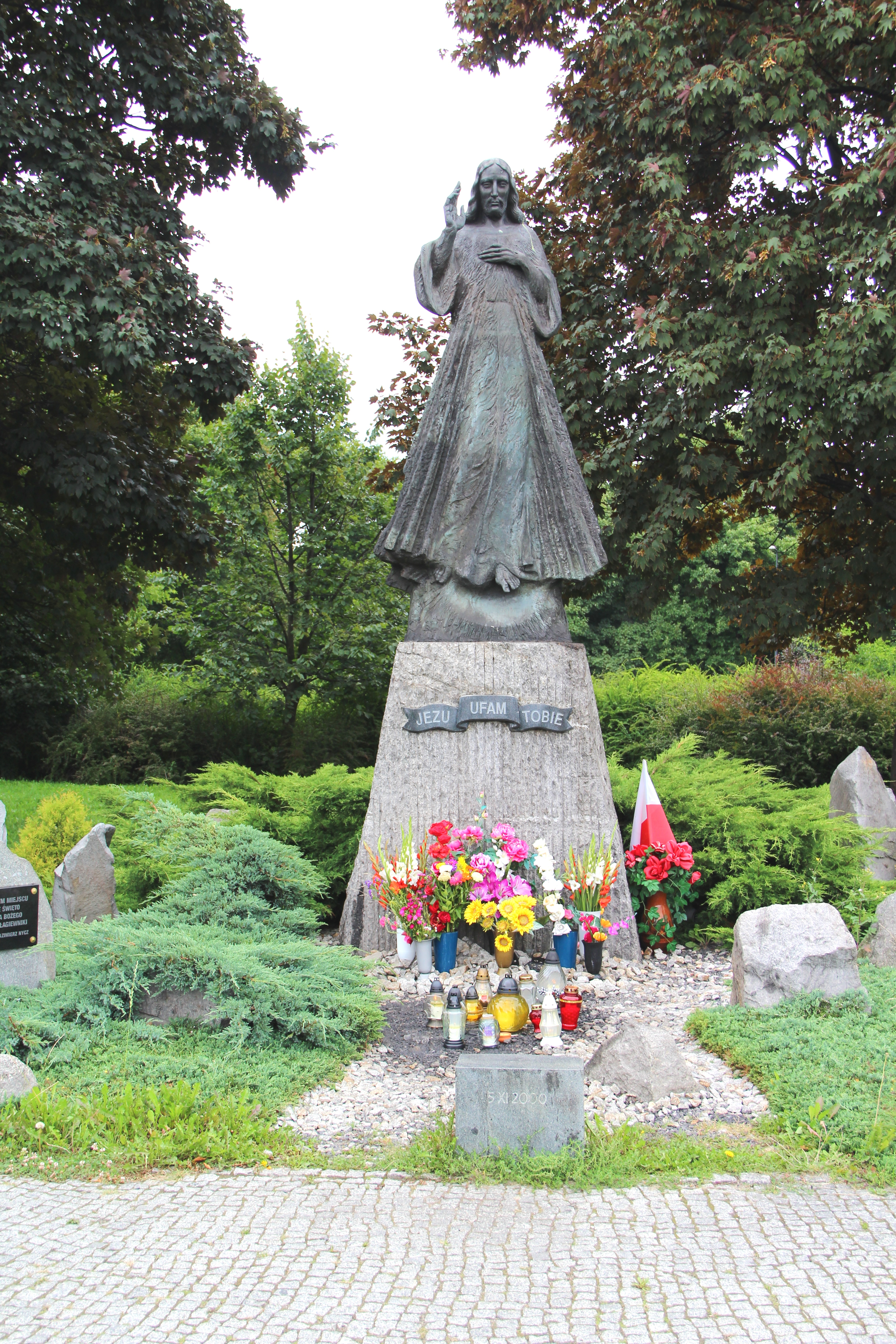
Sculpture Chist of Devine Mercy by Gustaw Zemła
