= Warszawa Młynów railway station =

Railway station in Warsaw, Poland

Warszawa Młynów
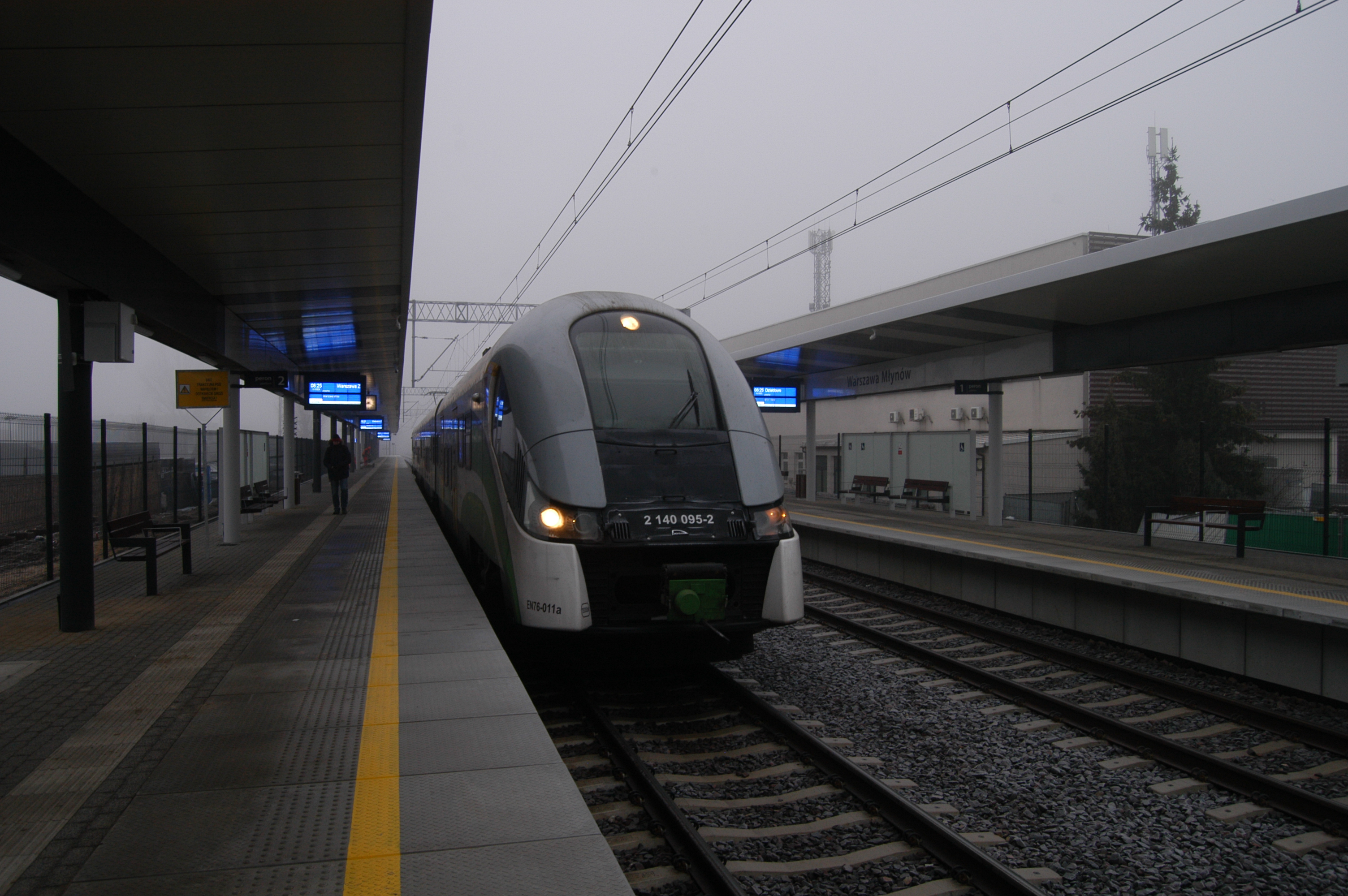

General information
- Location: Wola, Warsaw, Masovian; Poland
- Coordinates: 52°14′21″N 20°57′31″E
- Owner: Polskie Koleje Państwowe S.A.
- Platforms: 2
- Tracks: 2
- Connections: Młynów

History
- Opened: 1988
- Rebuilt: 12 March 2017 – 21 October 2018
- Former names: Warszawa Koło

Services
Preceding station	Masovian Railways	Following station
Warszawa Wola towards Warszawa Zachodnia	R90	Warszawa Koło towards Działdowo
Warszawa Wola towards Warszawa Zachodnia	RE90	Warszawa Koło towards Działdowo
Preceding station	SKM Warsaw	Following station
Warszawa Wola towards Warsaw Chopin Airport	S3	Warszawa Koło towards Legionowo Piaski or Radzymin
Warszawa Wola towards Piaseczno	S4	Warszawa Koło towards Zegrze Południowe
Location

Warszawa Młynów railway station is a railway station in the Wola district of Warsaw, Poland. It was built on the Warsaw orbital line, which goes through Warszawa Gdańska station. In 2011, it was used exclusively by Masovian Railways which run the KM9 services from Warszawa Wola through the north of the Masovian Voivodeship to Działdowo, in the Warmian-Masurian Voivodeship, via Legionowo, Nasielsk, Modlin, Ciechanów and Mława, at all of which some trains terminate.

The station was originally opened in 1988, named Warszawa Koło for the Koło neighborhood of the Wola district. It was closed in March 2017 for the reconstruction of the Warszawa Zachodnia−Warszawa Gdańska railway line. Upon reopening in October 2018, its name was changed to Warszawa Młynów, mirroring the nearby Młynów metro station in Młynów opened in April 2020. The name Warszawa Koło is used for a new station located further to the north.

Station in 2007

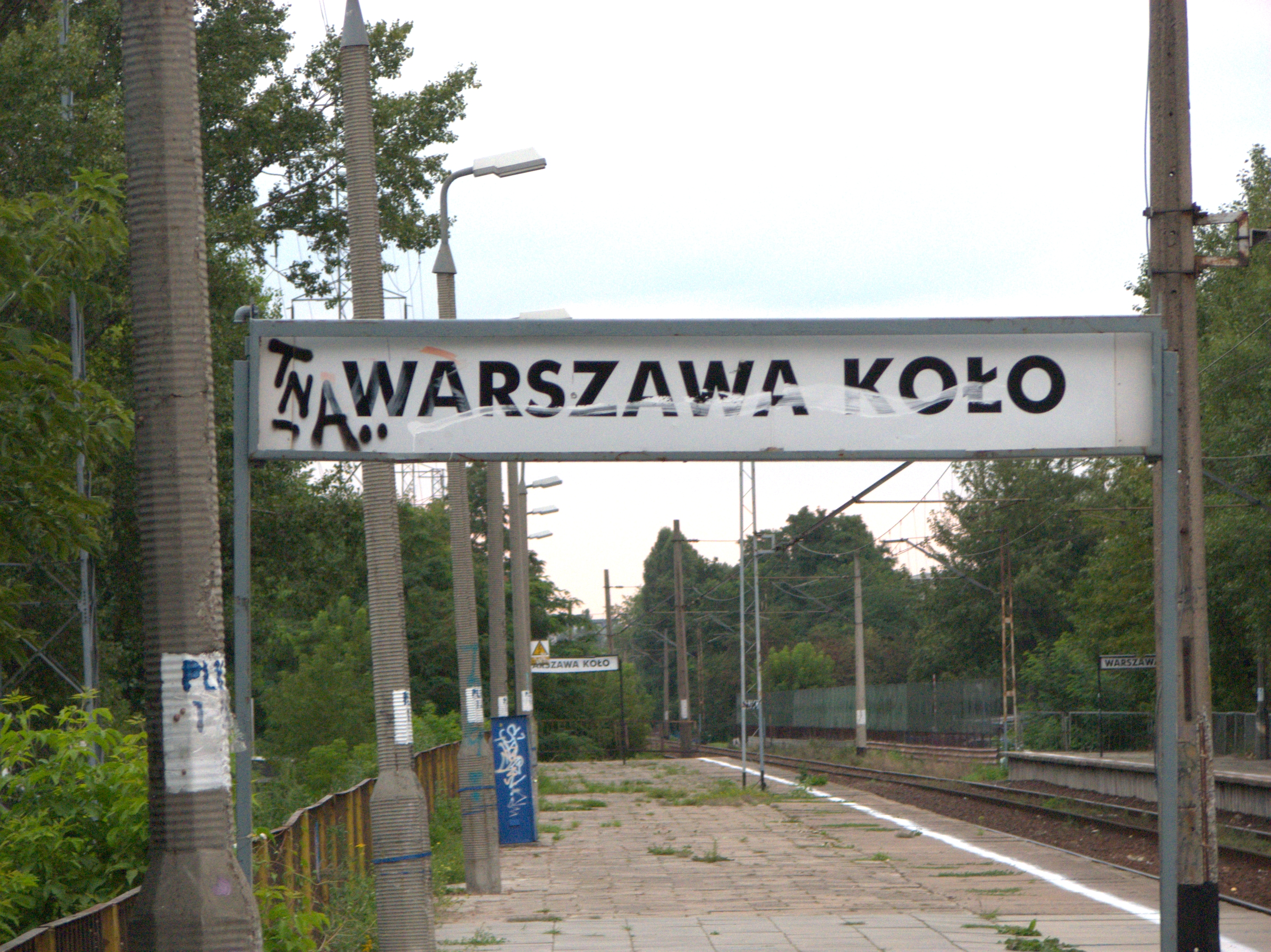

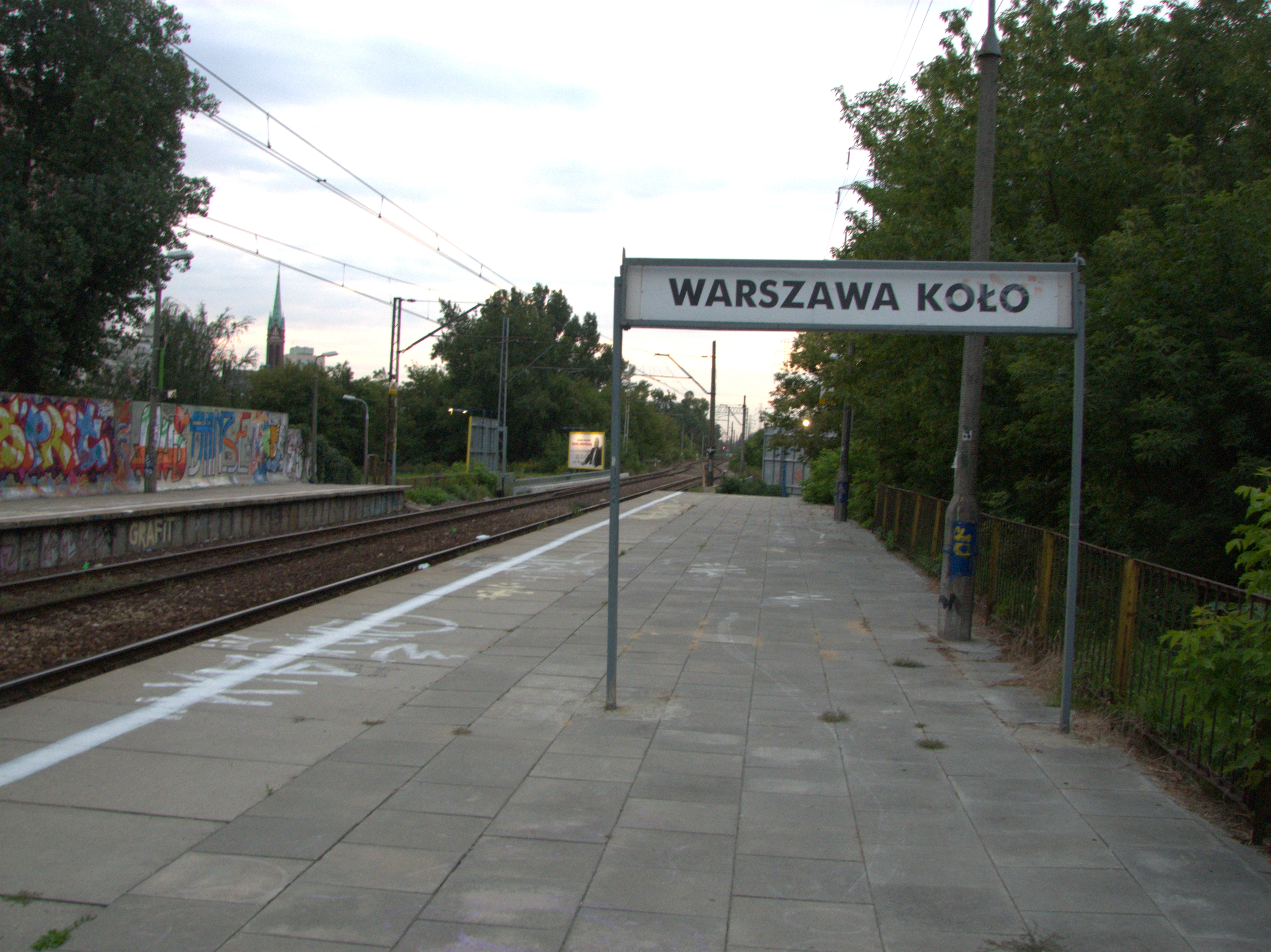

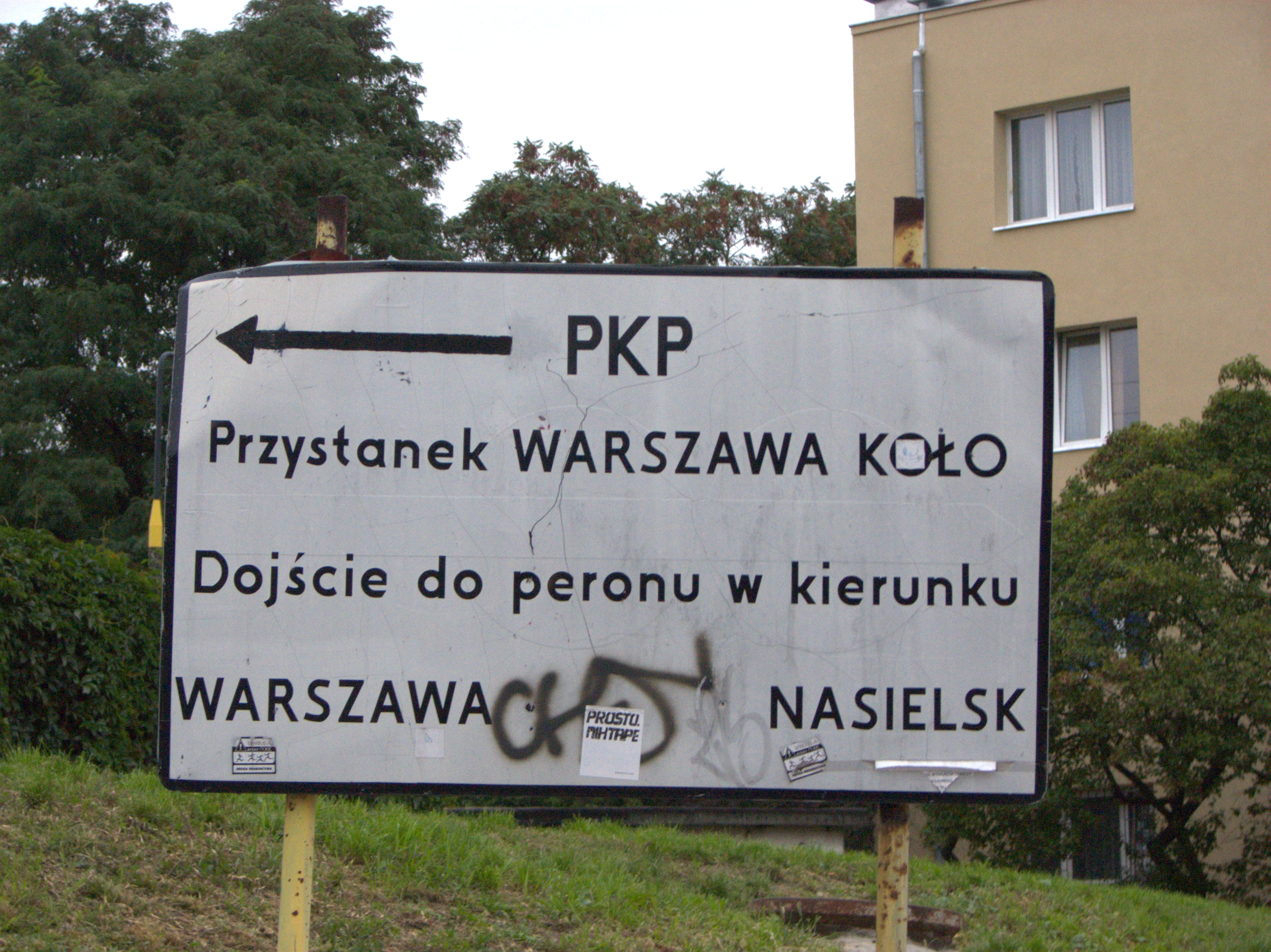
