= Młynów metro station =

Warsaw metro station

Młynów
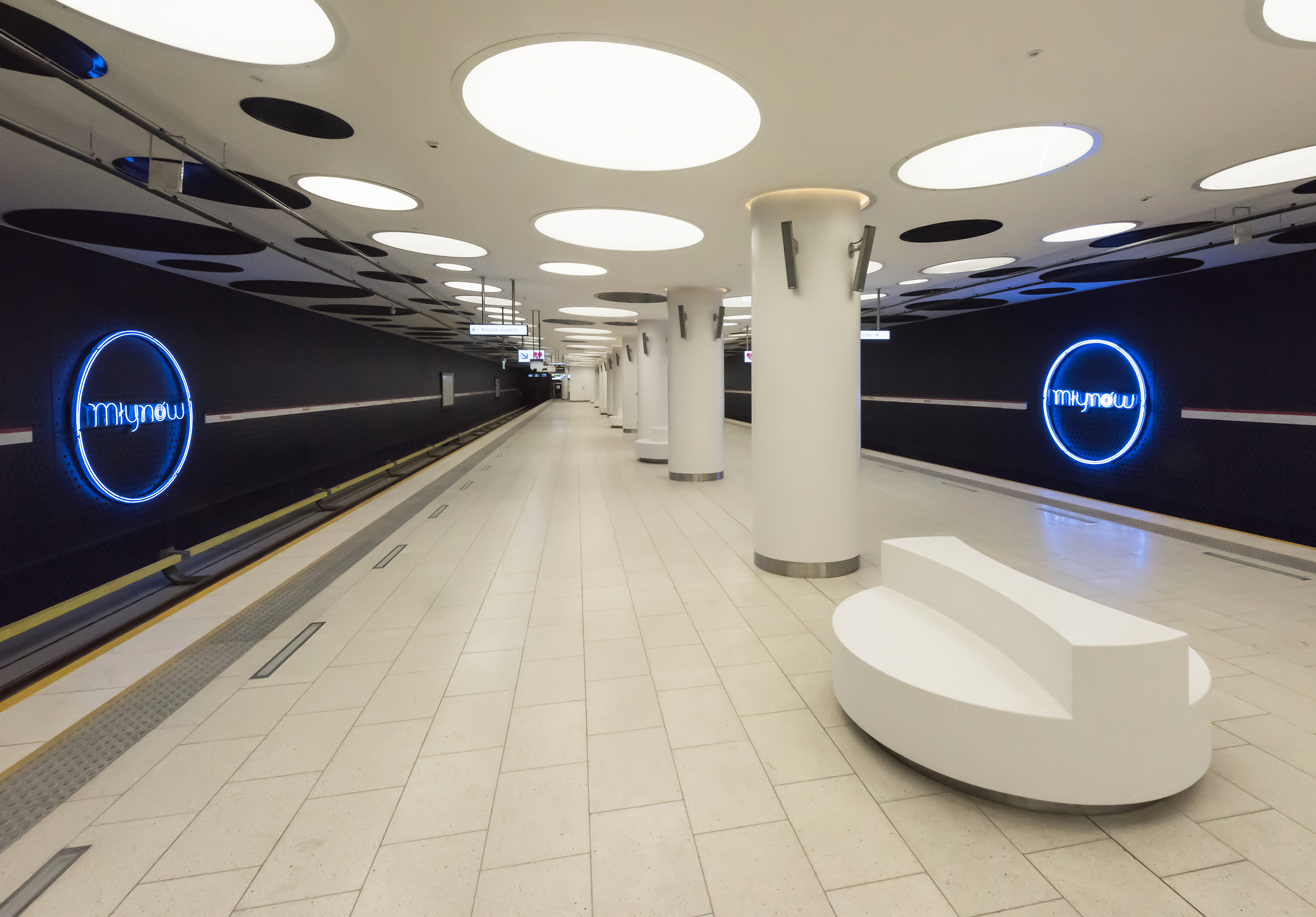

General information
- Coordinates: 52.2377°N 20.9599°E
- Owner: ZTM Warszawa
- Operator: ZTM Warszawa
- Platforms: 1 island platform
- Tracks: 2
- Connections: Warszawa Młynów; 171, 186, 190, 414, 523; N42, N43

Construction
- Structure type: Underground
- Platform levels: 1
- Accessible: Yes

Other information
- Station code: C-7
- Fare zone: 1

History
- Opened: 4 April 2020; 6 years ago
- Former names: Moczydło (During planning phase)

Services
Preceding station	Warsaw Metro	Following station
Księcia Janusza towards Bemowo	M2 line	Płocka towards Bródno
Location
- Location within Warsaw

Młynów is a M2 metro line Warsaw Metro station in Wola district, by the intersection of Górczewska and Syreny streets.

It is part of the extension of Line M2 from Rondo Daszyńskiego to Wola, with construction started in 2016. All three stations opened on April 4, 2020.

The station is 168.2 m in length, and the cubic capacity at 56 636 m^{3}. The blue colour scheme of the station refers to the nearby swimming pool in Moczydło estate.

== Description ==
The station is located 300 m west of the Institute of Tuberculosis and Lung Diseases (Polish: Instytut Gruźlicy i Chorób Płuc) of the Ministry of Health, and 300 m east of the Park Moczydło and Park Edwarda Szymańskiego.

The contractor for the station was Gülermak, which won the tender completed on 29 October 2015. The construction works began on 26 November 2016. Along with Księcia Janusza and Płocka, the station is part of the extension of the M2 metro line from Rondo Daszyńskiego to Wola. All three stations opened on April 4, 2020.

== Gallery ==
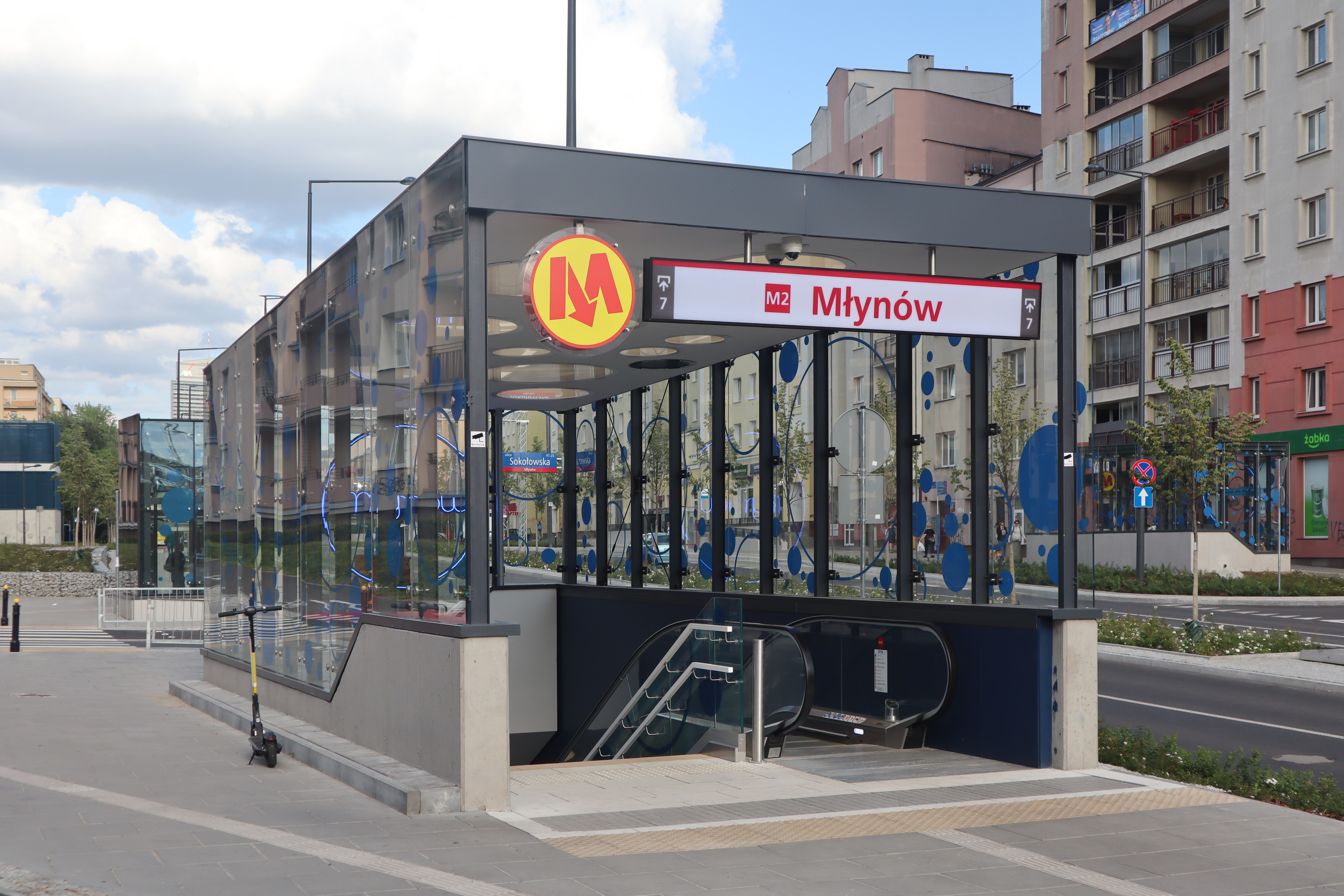
Entrance to the station

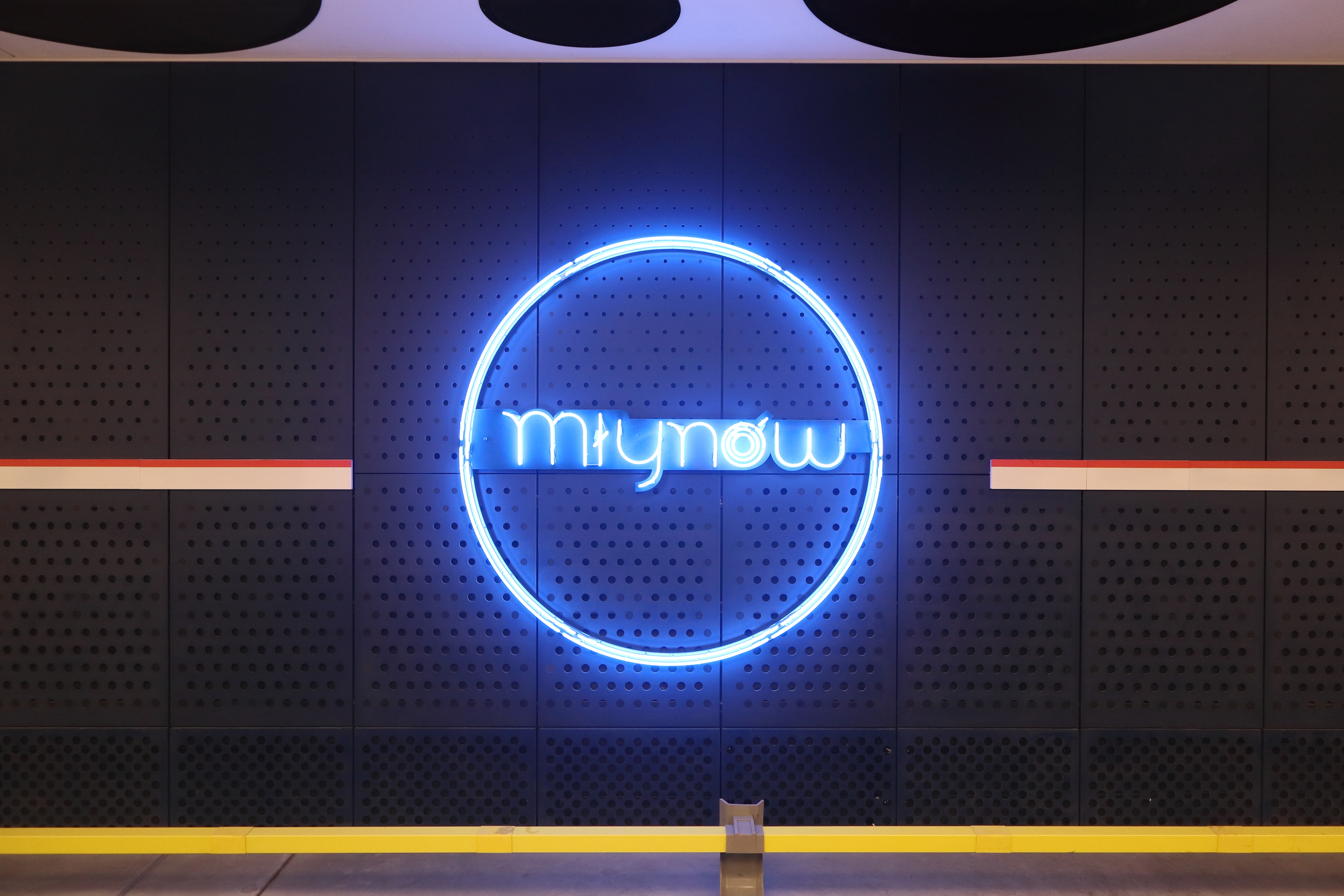
Neon with metro station name
