= Stare Górce =

Neighbourhood in Warsaw, Poland

- Neighbourhood
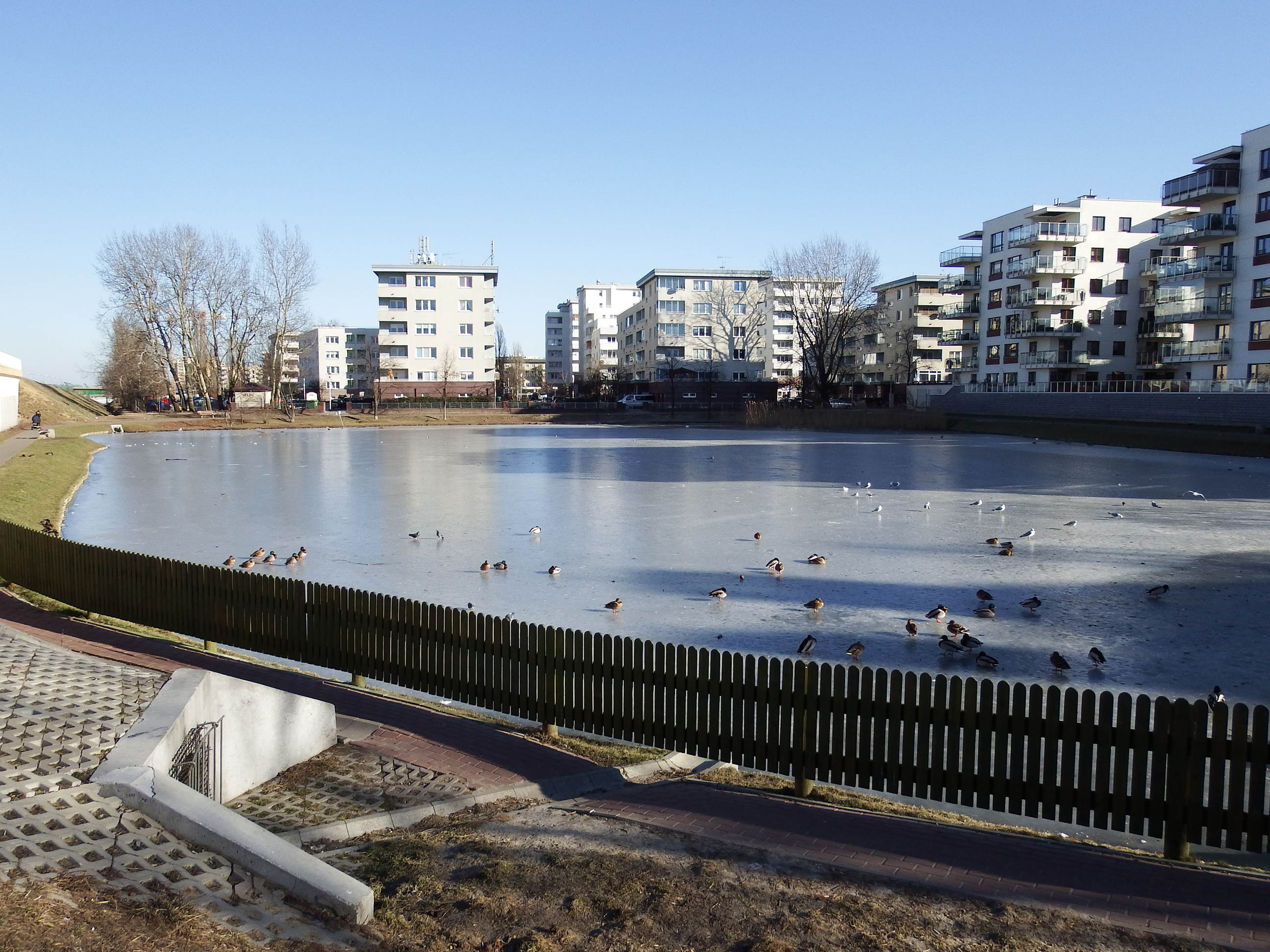
- Apartment buildings around the Jeziorzec Pond in Górce, in 2015.
- Interactive map of Stare Górce
- Coordinates: 52.241971°N 20.904435°E
- Country: Poland
- Voivodeship: Masovian
- City and county: Warsaw
- District: Bemowo
- City Information System area: Górce
- Incorporation into Warsaw: 14 May 1951
- Time zone: UTC+1 (CET)
  - Summer (DST): UTC+2 (CEST)
- Area code: +48 22

Stare Górce (Polish: [ˈsta.rɛ ˈɡur.t͡sɛ]; lit. 'Old Górce') is a neighbourhood in the Bemowo district of Warsaw, Poland, in the western side of the City Information System area of Górce. It is a high-rise residential area dominated by apartment buildings. The neighbourhood features the Bemowo station of the M2 line of the Warsaw Metro rapid transit underground system.

In the 1940s, suburb neighbourhoods with single-family detached homes were built in the area, as the extension of the village of Górce. In the 1990s, the housing estates of apartment buildings began being developed in the area.

== History ==
The area of the modern neighbourhood used to be farmlands owned by the village of Górce, which itself was founded before the 15th century.

In the 19th century, several brickworks developed in the area, with the largest being Bogumił Schneider's factory in the nearby Jelonki. They sourced clay locally, leaving behind pits, which over time flooded, forming numerous ponds. Most of them were filled in during the 1940s, during the development of new housing in the area, with two remaining to this day within Górce being Jeziorzec and Green Pond.

In the 1920s, Górce became a suburb of Warsaw, with its lands being sold for the development of a low-rise neighbourhood with single-family detached homes. It survived the Second World War without major damage. During the conflict, and in its aftermath, the village rapidly developed with new housing, with people moving three after having their homes destroyed in Warsaw. Most of the new buildings were provisional structures built from wood or rubble recovered from destruction in the city. In 1950, a tram line was opened, forming a connection between Boernerowo with Koło and Ulrychów, partially crossing the current boundaries of Górce, via Dywizjonu 303 Street.

On 14 May 1951 the area was incorporated into the city of Warsaw, becoming part of the Wola district. On 29 December 1989, following an administrative reform in the city, it became part of the municipality of Warsaw-Wola, and on 25 March 1994, of the municipality of Warsaw-Bemowo, which, on 27 October 2002, was restructured into the city district of Bemowo.

In the 1980s, the area was cut vertically in the middle by Powstańców Śląskich Street, forming a boundary of two neighbourhoods, Stare Górce (Old Górce) to the west, and Nowe Górce (New Górce) to the east. In the 1990s, the western side begun to be developed with housing estates of high-rise apartment buildings, replacing old residential structures. In the 1992, a tram line was built alongside Górczewska Streets. In 2015, it was expanded on Powstańców Śląskich Street.

In the 1990s, the area began to be developed with housing estates of high-rise apartment buildings, replacing old residential structures. It was also cut vertically in the middle by Powstańców Śląskich Street, the area was cut vertically in the middle by Powstańców Śląskich Street, forming a boundary of two neighbourhoods, Stare Górce (Old Górce) to the west, and Nowe Górce (New Górce) to the east. In the 1992, a tram line was built alongside Górczewska Streets. In 2015, it was expanded on Powstańców Śląskich Street.

Between 2008 and 2011, a fragment of the Expressway S8, in form of Obrońców Grodna Avenue, was built crossing the neighbourhood.

In 2022, the Bemowo station of the M2 line of the Warsaw Metro rapid transit underground system, was opened at the corner of Górczewska and Powstańców Śląskich Streets.

== Characteristics ==
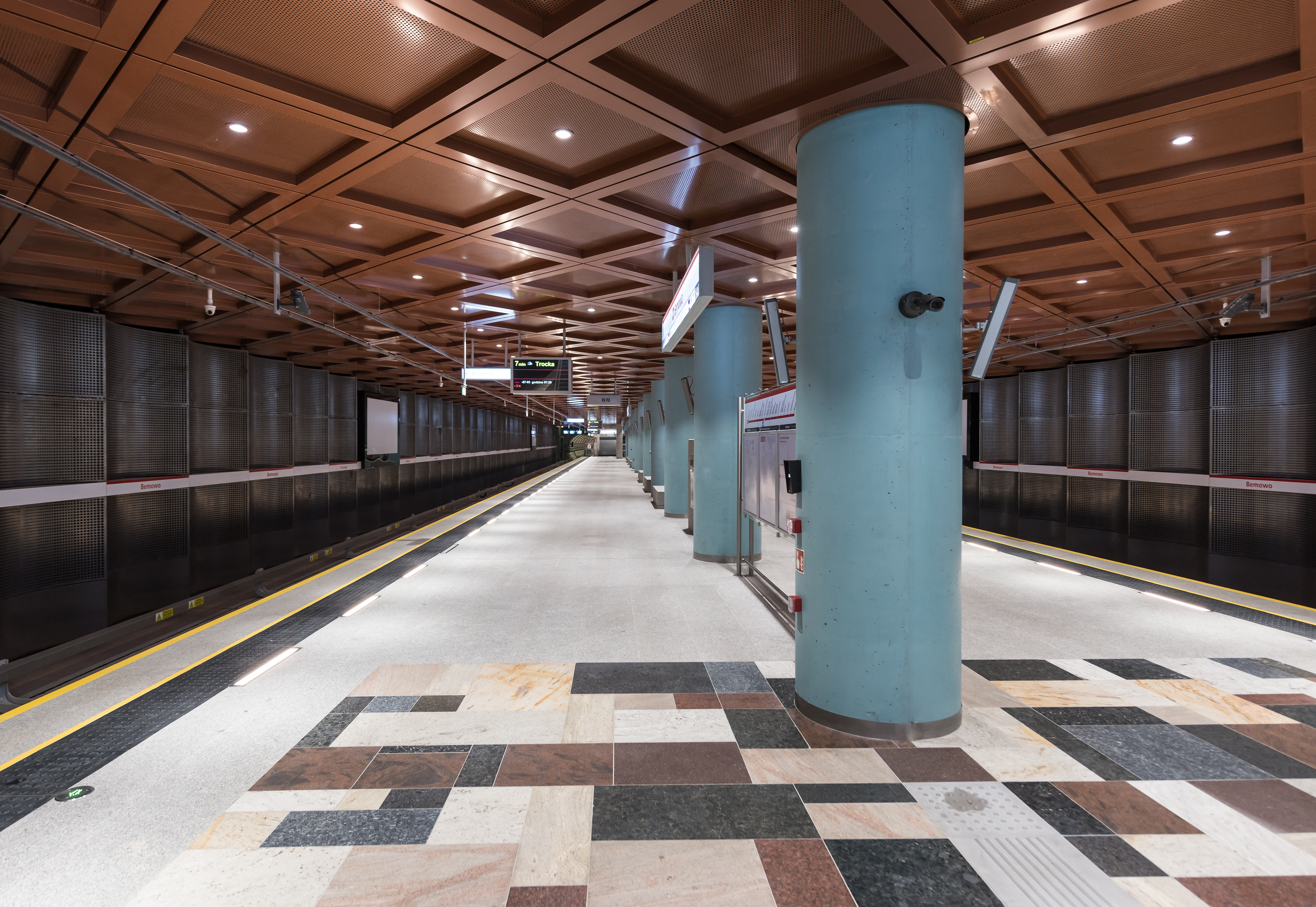
The Bemowo metro station.

Stare Górce is a residential neighbourhood dominated by high-rise apartment buildings. It includes the Bemowo station of the M2 line of the Warsaw Metro rapid transit underground system, at the corner of Górczewska and Powstańców Śląskich Streets. It also has three tram lines with tracks alongside Powstańców Śląskich Street, Górczewska Street, and Dywizjonu 303 Street. Additionally, it includes two small ponds, Jeziorzec and Green Pond. The neighbourhood is crossed by the Expressway S8, with section known as Obrońców Grodna Avenue.

== Boundaries ==
The neighbourhood boundaries are approximately determined by Dywizjonu 303 Street to the north, Powstańców Śląskich Street to the east, Górczewska Street to the south, and Lazurowa Street to the east.
