= Piłsudski's Mound =

Tumulus in Krakow, Poland, finished in 1937

Coordinates: 50°03.36′N 19°50.50′E

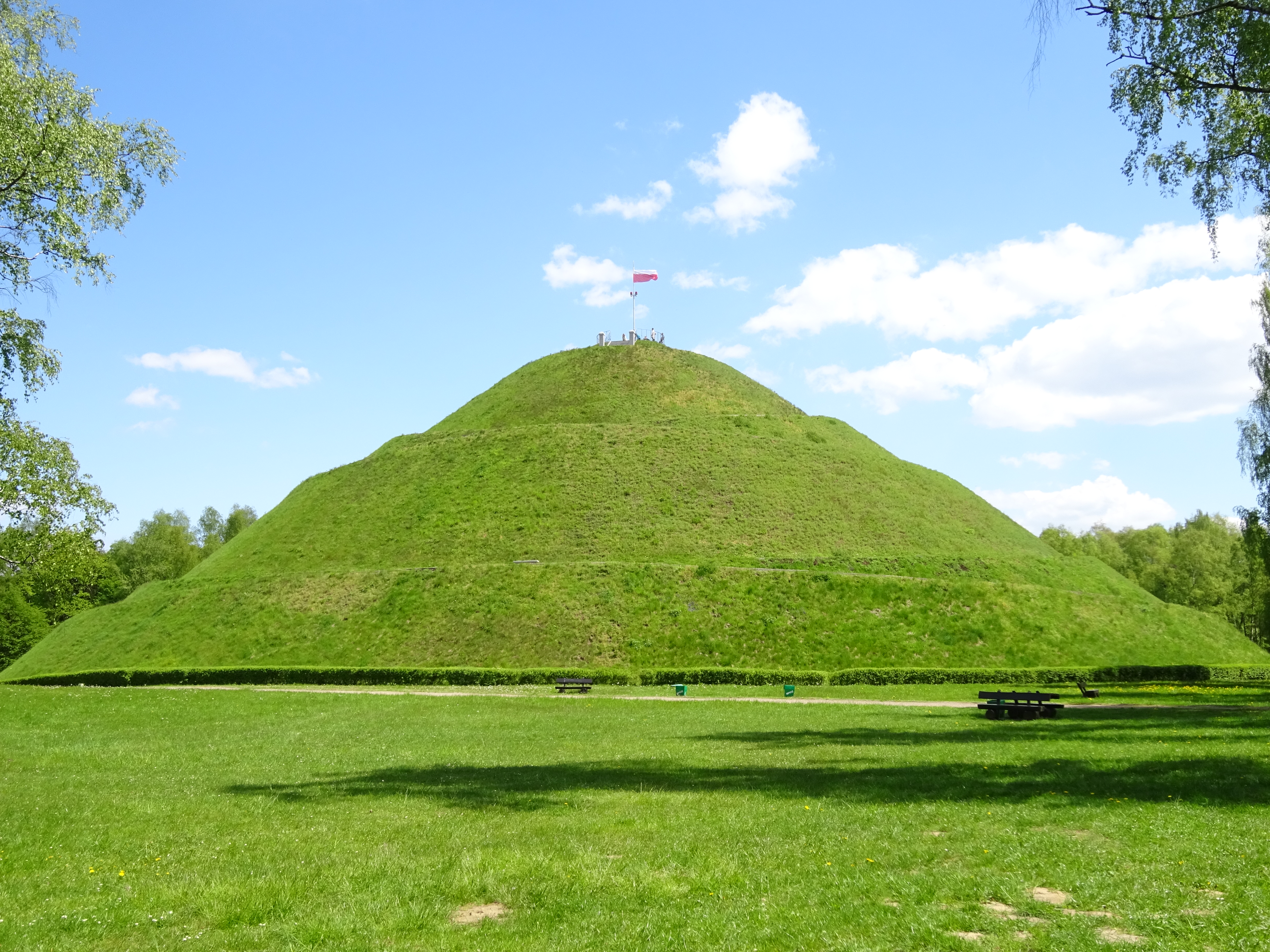
Piłsudski's Mound

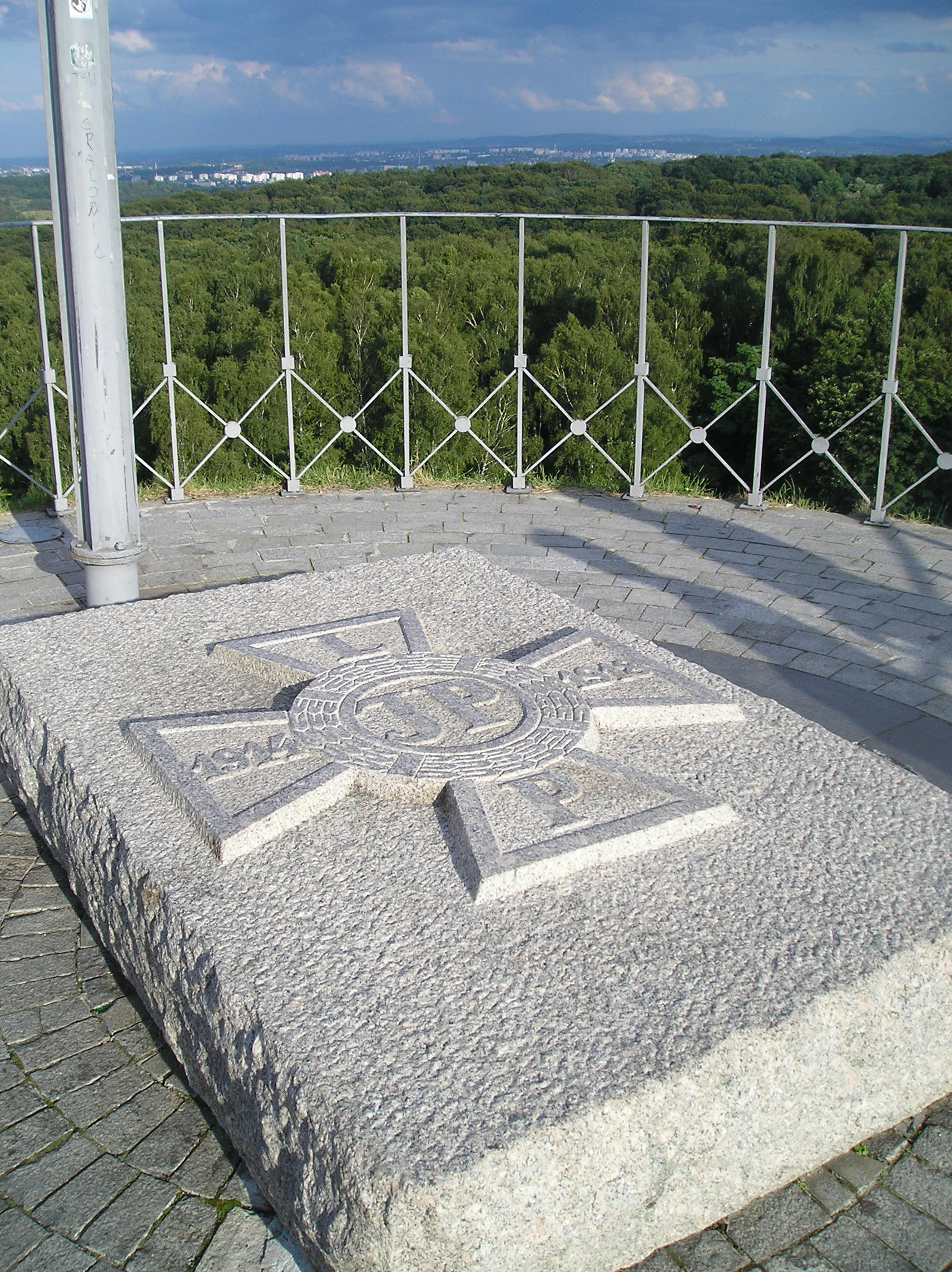
Monument at the top of Piłsudski's Mound

1936, construction of the mound

Piłsudski's Mound (Polish: kopiec Piłsudskiego; also known as the Independence Mound or Freedom Mound,) located in Kraków, Poland, was constructed by the Polish people in honor of Józef Piłsudski.

The mound, constructed between 1934 and 1937, is located in western Kraków's Sowiniec Heights, Kraków's VII District "Zwierzyniec".

It is the newest and largest of Kraków's four mounds. (Note: The other three major mounds in Kraków are Krakus' Mound, Wanda's Mound, and Kościuszko's Mound.)

== History ==
In 1934 the Polish Legionaires, and their associations, proposed building a monument commemorating the re-establishment of Poland's independence. The Committee for Mound Construction was created in Warsaw and was chaired by Walery Sławek. Construction began on 6 August 1934, the 20th anniversary of the departure of the First Cadre Company from Kraków at the beginning of World War I.

After the death of Marshal Józef Piłsudski on 12 May 1935, the Legionaires decided to name the mound after Piłsudski, who had created the Legions. The mound was completed on 9 July 1937. Soil from every World War I battlefield in which Poles fought was placed in the mound.

During World War II, Hans Frank, Nazi German governor of occupied Poland, ordered the flattening and destruction of the mound, but due to the difficulty and expense this was never done.

After the war, Poland's communist government, which considered the Mound a relic of the capitalist Second Polish Republic, still supported by the Polish government-in-exile, tried to minimize the mound's importance. Any mentions of it were removed from official publications and the surrounding area was filled with trees to help obscure the view. Unofficially it was referred to as "Kopiec Sowiniec" (the Sowiniec Mound). However, the most damage to the monument was inflicted during the Stalinist era; in 1953 the granite tablet with the Legion's cross was removed, and much of the mound's surface was devastated.

In 1981, with the weakening of the communist government, the reconstruction of the mound was begun. Soil from World War II battlefields in which various Polish armies participated was added to the monument, and it gained a nickname of 'Grave of Graves'. In 1995, five years after the fall of communism in Poland, the first major renovation of the mound was completed. In 1997 a major flood damaged the mound, and a second renovation began soon afterwards, finalized in 2002 with a ceremony attended by the president of Poland.

== Design ==
- architect: Franciszek Mączyński
- landscape architects: Romuald Gutt and Alina Scholtz
- height: 35 m (383 m AMSL)
- diameter of base: 111 m
- volume: 130,000 m³
