= Moczydło Mound =

Mound in Warsaw, Poland

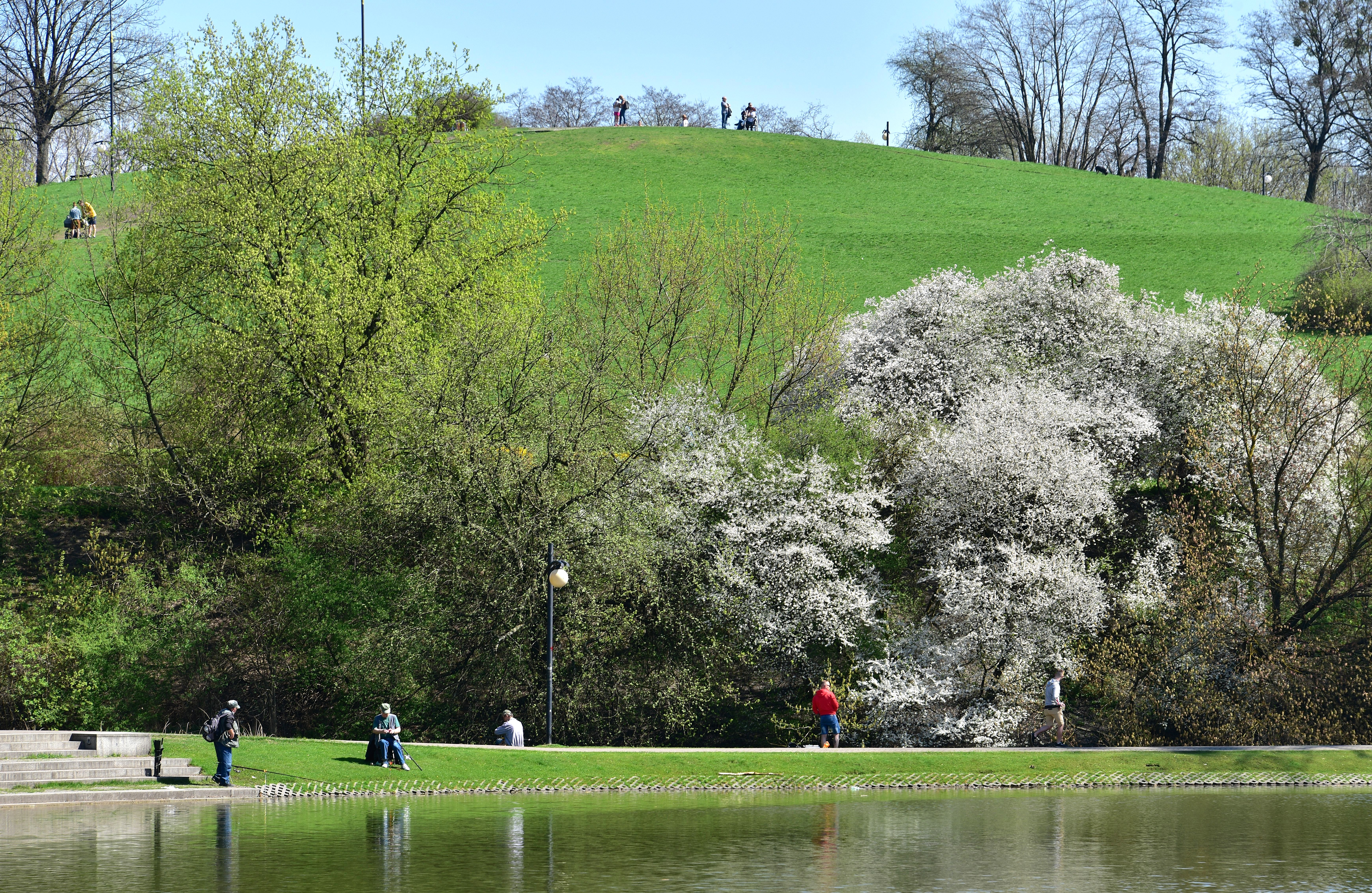
- The Moczydło Mound in 2018

Highest point
- Elevation: 130.5 m (428 ft)
- Coordinates: 52°14′34″N 20°57′19″E

Geography
- Country: Poland
- Voivodeship: Masovian
- City: Warsaw

The Moczydło Mound (Polish pronunciation: [mɔˈt͡ʂɘ̟.dwɔ]; Polish: Kopiec Moczydłowski), also known as the Moczydło Mountain (Polish: Górka Moczydłowska), is a mound in Warsaw, Poland, within the district of Wola. It is located within the Moczydło Park, near the intersection of Czorsztyńska and Primate of the Millennium Avenue.

== Historia ==
Moczydło Mound was formed in the 1940s, from the rubble of buildings destroyed during the Second World War, brought from around the city. In the late 1960s, the area around it was developed into the Moczydło Park. The mound was then covered in dirt and there was installed a T-bar ski lift.

== Overview ==
The Moczydło Mound, is an artificial hill, near the intersection of Czorsztyńska and Primate of the Millennium Avenue, with the height of 130.5 m. It is made from rubble and covered in dirt, and features a T-bar ski lift.
