= Alina Scholtz =

Polish landscape architect

- Born: Alina Zofia Scholtz; 24 September 1908; Lublin, Poland
- Died: 25 February 1996 (aged 87); Warsaw, Poland
- Other names: Alina Scholtzówna, Alina Scholtz-Richert
- Occupation: landscape architect
- Years active: 1933-1980

Alina Scholtz (24 September 1908 – 25 February 1996) was a Polish landscape architect, known as one of country's pioneers in developing the field. Throughout her career she worked on various public and private projects for cemeteries, parks and green spaces. Some of her most noted works include the grounds of a villa on Kielecka Street in Warsaw for which she won a Silver Medal at the 1937 World Exhibition in Paris, the memorial cemetery to the victims of the Palmiry massacre, and landscaping projects along the East-West traffic route of Warsaw. In addition to her design work, she served as one of the founding members of the International Federation of Landscape Architects.

== Early life ==
Alina Zofia Scholtz was born on 24 September 1908 in Lublin, in Congress Poland. In 1918, she entered the female gymnasium in Lublin, graduating in 1926 and began working in a local plant nursery. She entered university, beginning her education in art history, but quickly changed her plans and enrolled in the horticulture department at the Warsaw University of Life Sciences (Polish: Szkoła Główna Gospodarstwa Wiejskiego (SGGW)). During her practicum in 1928, she participated in the first classes offered by Franciszek Krzywda-Polkowski (pl) at the Skierniewice Experimental Station, with five colleagues. In 1930, she traveled to the United Kingdom to study English landscape planning and design. She visited a variety of noted gardens like Brocket Hall in Hertfordshire, Cator Court in Devon, Dawyck Botanic Garden in the Scottish Borders near Peeblesshire, and Sutton Place in Surrey, among others. Scholtz completed her graduate thesis and design project, creating a park at the Royal Castle of Warsaw, in 1932, earning a certification as a Gardening Engineer.

== Career ==
In 1933 Scholtz became an assistant in the Department of Architecture and Park Studies for SGGW in Warsaw. Between 1933 and 1939, she designed several projects for single-family residences, a project for the Brühl Palace in Warsaw, a green space project for the Służewiec Racecourse, and the park in the Niebieskie Źródła Nature Reserve. She also participated in joint projects during the period: with Romuald Gutt for the greenery of Piłsudski's Mound in Kraków; with Krzywda-Polkowski to develop a park in Żelazowa Wola; and again working with Gutt in a restoration project on the Zułów estate, birthplace of Józef Piłsudski. In 1937, Scholtz and Gutt were awarded a Silver Medal at the World Exhibition in Paris for their landscaping at a villa on Kielecka Street in Warsaw. In 1938 Scholtz became a member of the Society of Polish Urbanists.

During World War II Scholtz worked as a horticulturist and conservator of the greenery in Żelazowa Wola and when the war ended she returned to her position at SGGW as an adjunct professor. In 1945, she and Gutt designed the Warsaw Insurgents Cemetery at the request of Colonel Jan Mazurkiewicz. Their design called for a wide central avenue rimmed by rows of trees, which had a chapel-mausoleum at one end and a decorative arrangement of the graves. The two also worked on the Palmiry Cemetery memorial. In 1946 she became a member of the Association of Polish Architects (Polish: Stowarzyszenia Architektów Polskich (SARP)) and two years later was one of the founding members of the International Federation of Landscape Architects (IFLA). When Krzywda-Polkowski died in 1949, Scholtz began working in the landscaping workshop of the Capital Reconstruction Office (Polish: Biuro Odbudowy Stolicy (BOS)), which would later become the Warsaw Urban Planning Office. The group was involved maintaining green spaces in Warsaw, planning and designing new recreational areas to emphasize and enhance the natural landscape, and providing residence with improved living conditions by providing interior garden spaces. One of the first projects Scholtz worked on for the office was the landscaping along the East-West traffic route. Between 1948 and 1949, she worked to reconstruct the Saxon Garden with Gutt.

Beginning in 1958, Scholtz worked on projects for a joint initiative between the Warsaw Housing Cooperative and the "Investproject" Cooperative to design landscaping for the housing projects designed Halina Skibniewska. In 1959, Scholtz designed a project in conjunction with the Warsaw Urban Planning Office, called the "People's Park" which included three parks in the Vistula River Gorge of Lesser Poland. The parks included a northern park, in Marymont; a park between Skaryszewski Park, formerly known as Paderewski Park, in the Praga Południe district of Warsaw and the Warsaw Zoo; and a central park located between the Ujazdów Castle and the building complex (pl) which housed the Sejm of the Kingdom of Poland. Only a small part of this project was ever completed, which was originally called the Powiśle Central Park of Culture and Recreation, and is now known as the Park Marszałka Edwarda Rydza-Śmigłego in Warsaw. Scholtz co-designed with Zbigniew Karpiński and Jerzy Kowarski the garden at the Polish Embassy in Beijing; a garden with Gutt and Tadeusz Zieliński and Zbigniew Karpiński at the Chinese Embassy in Warsaw; and a garden with Gutt, Wieslaw Nowak, and Zieliński and Wiesław Nowak at the Polish Embassy in Pyongyang, North Korea.

For many years, Scholtz served as the SARP delegate to the International Federation of Landscape Architects. From 1964, she was the coordinator of the Landscape Architecture Section of the Association of Polish Architects. The following year, she was selected by SARP to serve on the Verification and Artistic Commission. In July 1979, the association honored her with the status of "Creator", the year before her retirement.

== Death and legacy ==
Scholtz died on 25 February 1996, in Warsaw. She is known as one of the founders of Polish landscape architecture.
