= Blizne Łaszczyńskiego =

- Village
- Location within Poland
- Coordinates: 52°14′40″N 20°53′8″E
- Country: Poland
- Voivodeship: Masovian
- County: Warsaw West
- Gmina: Stare Babice
- Population (2010): 813

Blizne Łaszczyńskiego [ˈbliznɛ waʂt͡ʂɨɲsˈkʲɛɡɔ] is a village in the administrative district of Gmina Stare Babice, within Warsaw West County, Masovian Voivodeship, in east-central Poland.
