= Młynów, Warsaw =

Neighborhood in Warsaw, Poland

Coordinates: 52.2392°N 20.9601°E

Location of Młynów within the borough of Wola

Młynów (Polish pronunciation: [ˈmwɨnuf]) is a neighbourhood of the western borough of Wola in Warsaw, the capital of Poland.

== History ==
Since the late Middle Ages, the area of modern Młynów belonged to the nearby village of Wielka Wola. Initially mostly occupied by arable land, in 1792 the Evangelical Cemetery of the Augsburg Confession was founded there. Soon afterwards additional cemeteries were built nearby: Christian Powązki Cemetery and the Okopowa Street Jewish Cemetery (both in modern times located in the neighbourhood of Powązki). In the 19th century, the rapidly growing city swallowed Wola and its fields, located right outside the city limits were a convenient location for numerous windmills, which became the namesake for the entire area: Młynów's literal translation is "Place of Mills". Opening of the Warsaw–Vienna railway saw many granaries constructed there as well. During World War I, in 1916 Młynów, along with the rest of the suburb of Wola, was incorporated into the city of Warsaw. During the following war and the Warsaw Uprising of 1944 most of the original cityscape has been levelled to the ground by the Germans. After the war the neighbourhood was rebuilt, in part in Soc-Realist style.
