= Polish Telephone Joint-Stock Company =

Defunct Polish telecommunications company

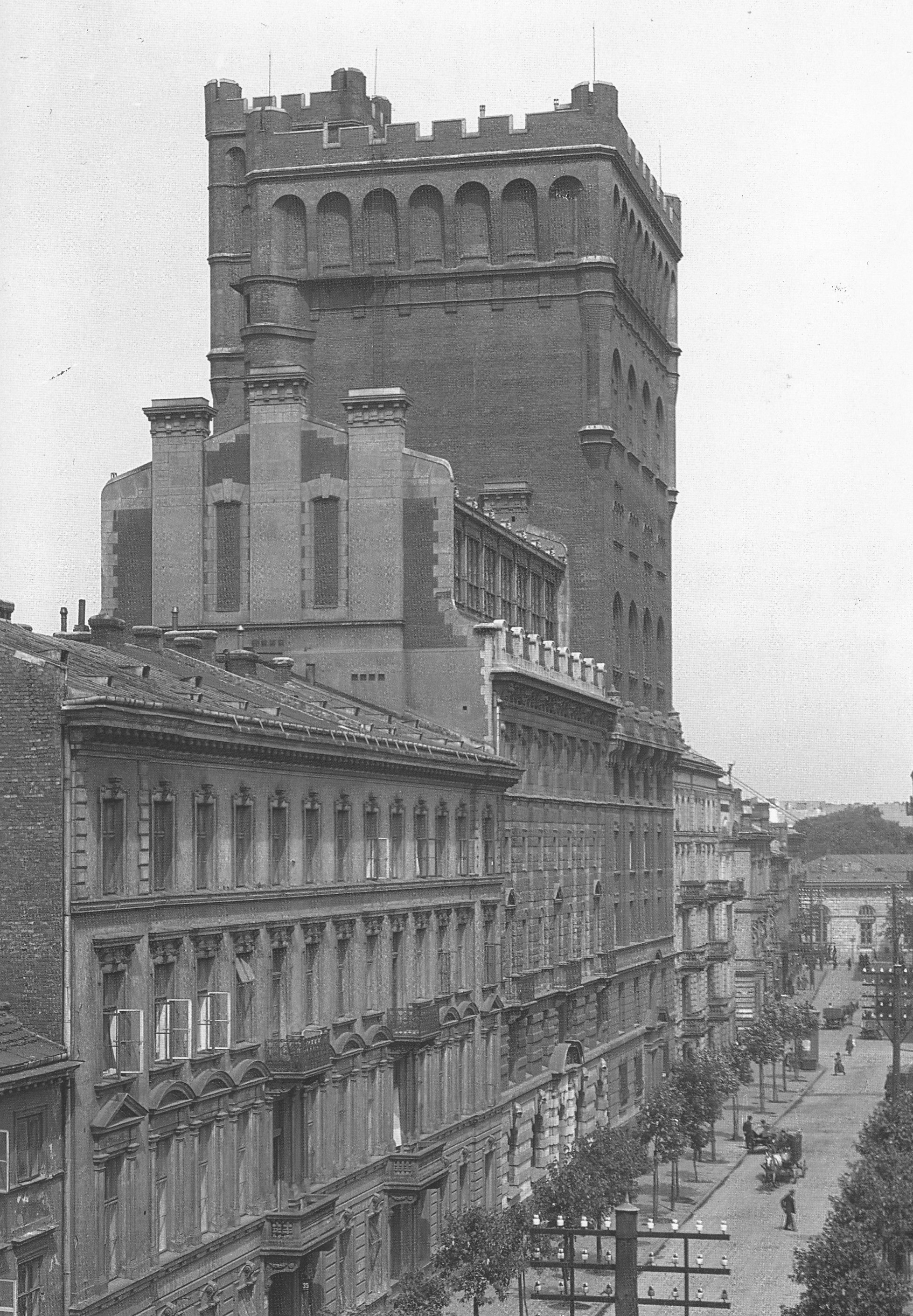
- The Cedergren Society building complex at 37/39 Zielna Street (middle left), transferred to PAST in 1922
- Native name: Polska Akcyjna Spółka Telefoniczna
- Company type: Joint-stock company
- Industry: Telecommunications
- Founded: July 1, 1922
- Defunct: 1948; 78 years ago
- Headquarters: PAST Building, Warsaw, Poland
- Owner: Government of Poland

Polish Telephone Joint-Stock Company (Polish: Polska Akcyjna Spółka Telefoniczna) was a Polish telecommunications company headquartered in Warsaw active during the Second Polish Republic's existence.

== History ==
The Swedish-owned company Cedergren won a tender in 1900 to expand the Warsaw telephone network. A mixed state-private company established on July 1, 1922 as joint venture of the Government of Poland and with the license of the Swedish Cedergren Telephone Company. It received a license for 25 years, until 1947. As a result of negotiations, the State Treasury and Cedergren each acquired 3/7 of the shares, and 1/7 of the shares were designated for sale to private individuals (they were later also purchased by the Swedish shareholder).

PAST's headquarters were located in the former "Cedergren" headquarters at 37 Zielna Street, which, together with the adjacent building belonging to the Swedish company (no. 39), became known as PAST.

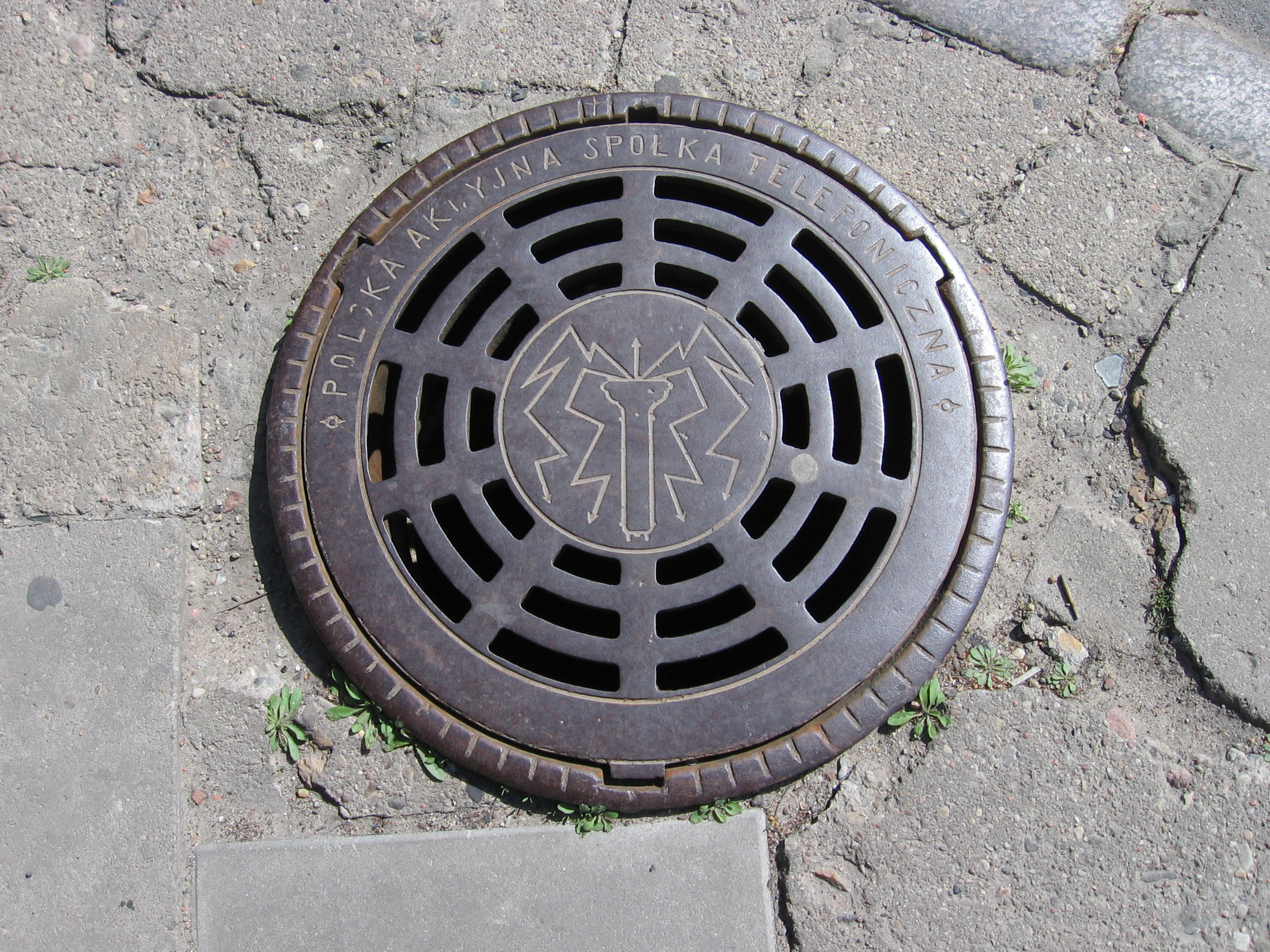
Telecommunication hole of PAST

The company operated in Warsaw (network contributed by "Cedergren") and in Lviv, Łódź, Lublin, Białystok, and the Sosnowiec-Dąbrowa Górnicza Basin and the Borysław Basin (networks contributed by the State Treasury). In Warsaw, due to the growing demand for telephone services, it created a network consisting of six automatic exchanges, located at Zielna Street 39, Piusa XI Street 19, Brzeska Street 24, A. Felińskiego Street 39, and Tłomackie street 10, among others. Telephone call meters were introduced, along with significant fee increases, which sparked customer protests.

At the end of 1930, the number of subscribers in Warsaw reached 44,200. In 1939, all Warsaw Telephone exchanges had a capacity of 90,000. numbers, and approximately 75,000 subscribers were connected to them. In 1935, the intercity exchange was moved from the building at 37 Zielna Street to a new building at 45 Nowogrodzka Street. PAST also built a telephone exchange building in Łódź.

In 1934, a clock synchronized with the clock at the Warsaw Astronomical Observatory was launched, and in 1937, an Order Office was opened. In 1939, the company employed 1,080 people in Warsaw.

After Warsaw's capitulation following the Invasion of Poland in September 1939, 1,850 telephones were in operation in the partially destroyed city by January 4, 1940. On October 1, 1940, the company came under the management of Deutsche Post Osten. Some employees were laid off, and new employment contracts with the remaining employees were signed on less favorable terms. During World War II, PAST's telephone exchanges in Warsaw were 100% destroyed, and its cable telephone networks were 70% destroyed. After the war, with the establishment of the Polish People's Republic, the company's assets became state property in 1948 and incorporated into Polska Poczta, Telegraf i Telefon.

== See also ==
- Polska Poczta, Telegraf i Telefon
