= Boernerowo =

Neighbourhood in Warsaw, Poland

- City Information System area (neighbourhood)
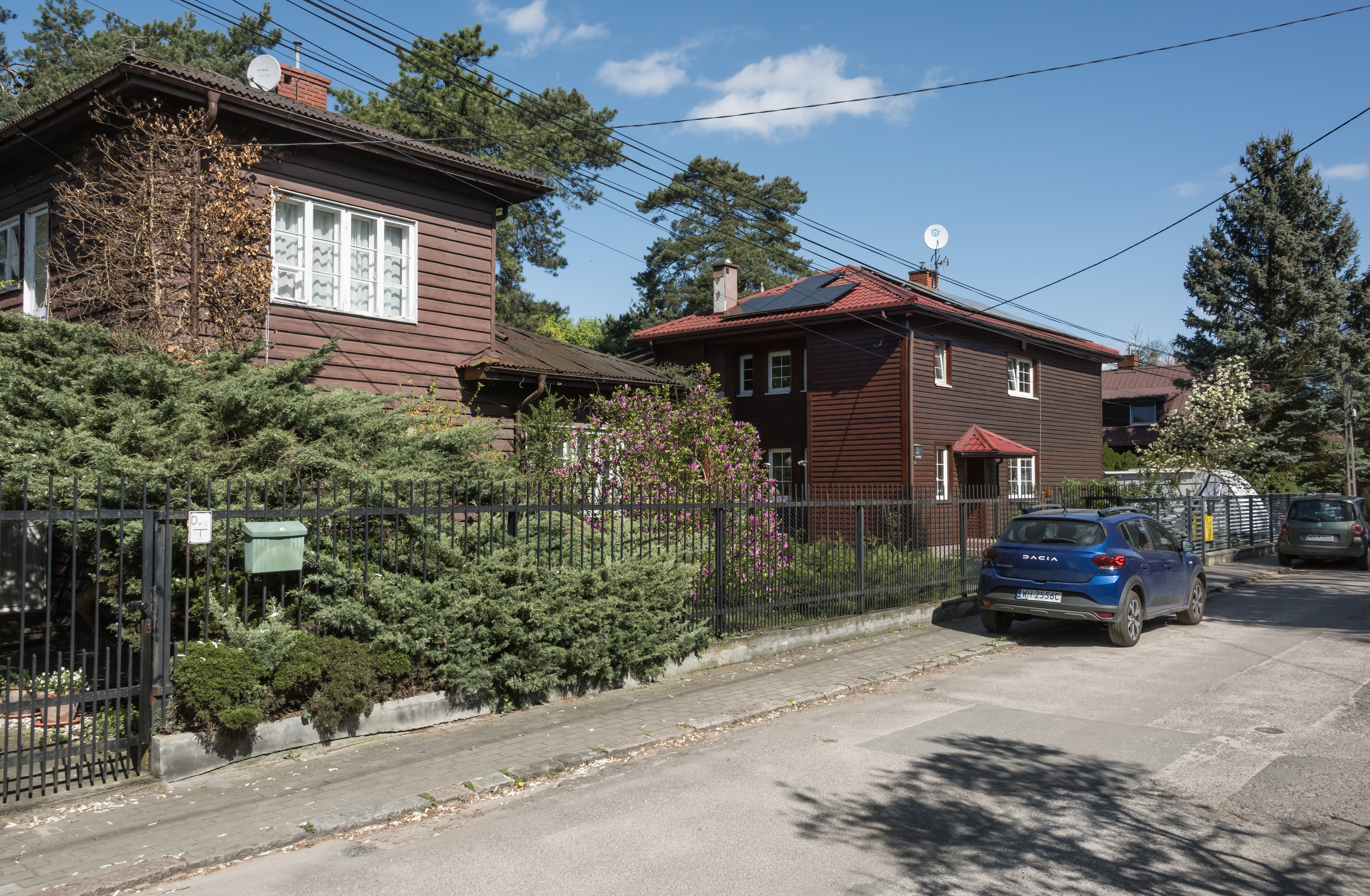
- Historic wooden houses at Bawełniana Street in 2024.

- The location of the City Information System area of Boernerowo within the district of Bemowo
- Coordinates: 52.263179°N 20.901850°E
- Country: Poland
- Voivodeship: Masovian
- City and county: Warsaw
- District: Bemowo
- Establishment: 1933
- Time zone: UTC+1 (CET)
  - Summer (DST): UTC+2 (CEST)
- Area code: +48 22

Boernerowo (Polish: [bɔ.ɛr.nɛˈrɔ.vɔ]) is a neighbourhood, and an area of the City Information System, in Warsaw, Poland, within the district of Bemowo. It is a residential estate with detached and semi-detached houses.

Boernerowo, originally called Osiedle Łączności (Neighbourhood of Communications), was developed between 1933 and 1938, in an area donated by the Ministry of Post and Telegraphs, partially for the employees of the nearby Transatlantic Radiotelegraph Exchange. It was incorporated into the city in 1951, and throughout the 1950s, the neighbourhood was requisitioned by the government, and its original population evicted.

== Toponomy ==
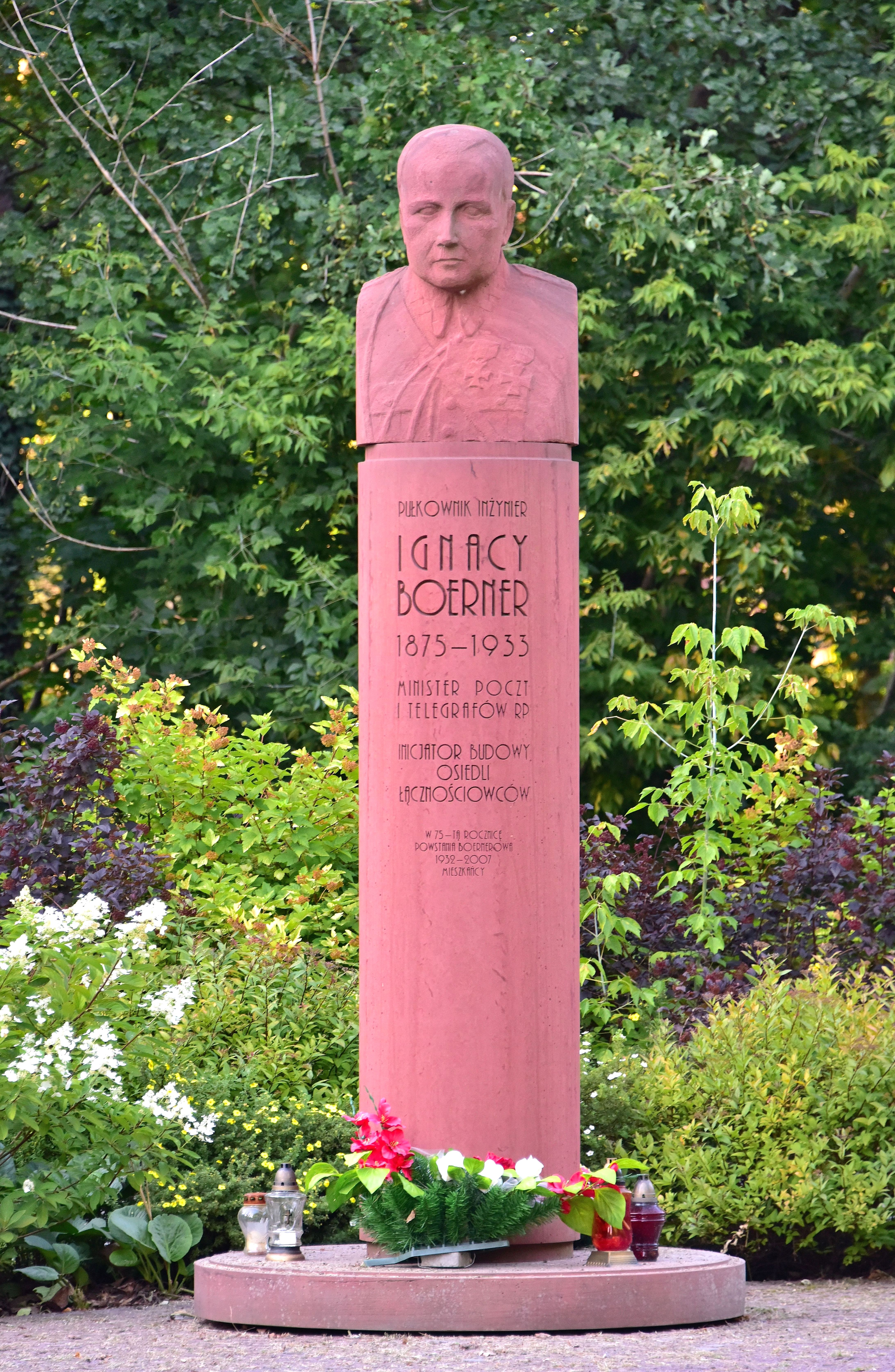
A monument dedicated to Ignacy Boerner in Boernerowo.

Boernerowo is named in honour of Ignacy Boerner, the Minister of Post and Telegraphs from 1929 to 1933, who prosed its founding. The name was first given to it on 28 September 1936. From 1947 to 1987, the neighbourhood was installed called Bemowo ([bɛˈmɔ.vɔ]), in honour Józef Bem, an 18th- and 19th-century engineer and military officer, and veteran of the November Uprising. It was chosen due to nearby fortification, originally known as the Fort Parysów, being named the Bem Fort in 1921. Years later, in 1994, the name was reused for the then founded city district of Bemowo.

Originally, prior to 1936, Boernerowo was known as Osiedle Łączności ([ɔˈɕɛ.dlɛ wɔnt͡ʂˈnɔɕ.t͡ɕi]), which translates from Polish to the Neighbourhood of Communications, in reference to the former Transatlantic Radiotelegraph Exchange, which operated nearby until 1945.

The northern part of the neighbourhood was originally a separate settlement founded by military veterans. It was known as Kolonia im. Aleksandry Piłsudskiej, meaning the Aleksandra Piłsudska Colony. It was named after a 20th-century socialist and Polish independence activist, member of Polish Socialist Party and Polish Military Organisation, and the second wife of Marshal of Poland Józef Piłsudski. Its main road, now known as Kleeberga Street, was originally also named after Piłsudska.

== History ==
=== Founding and development ===
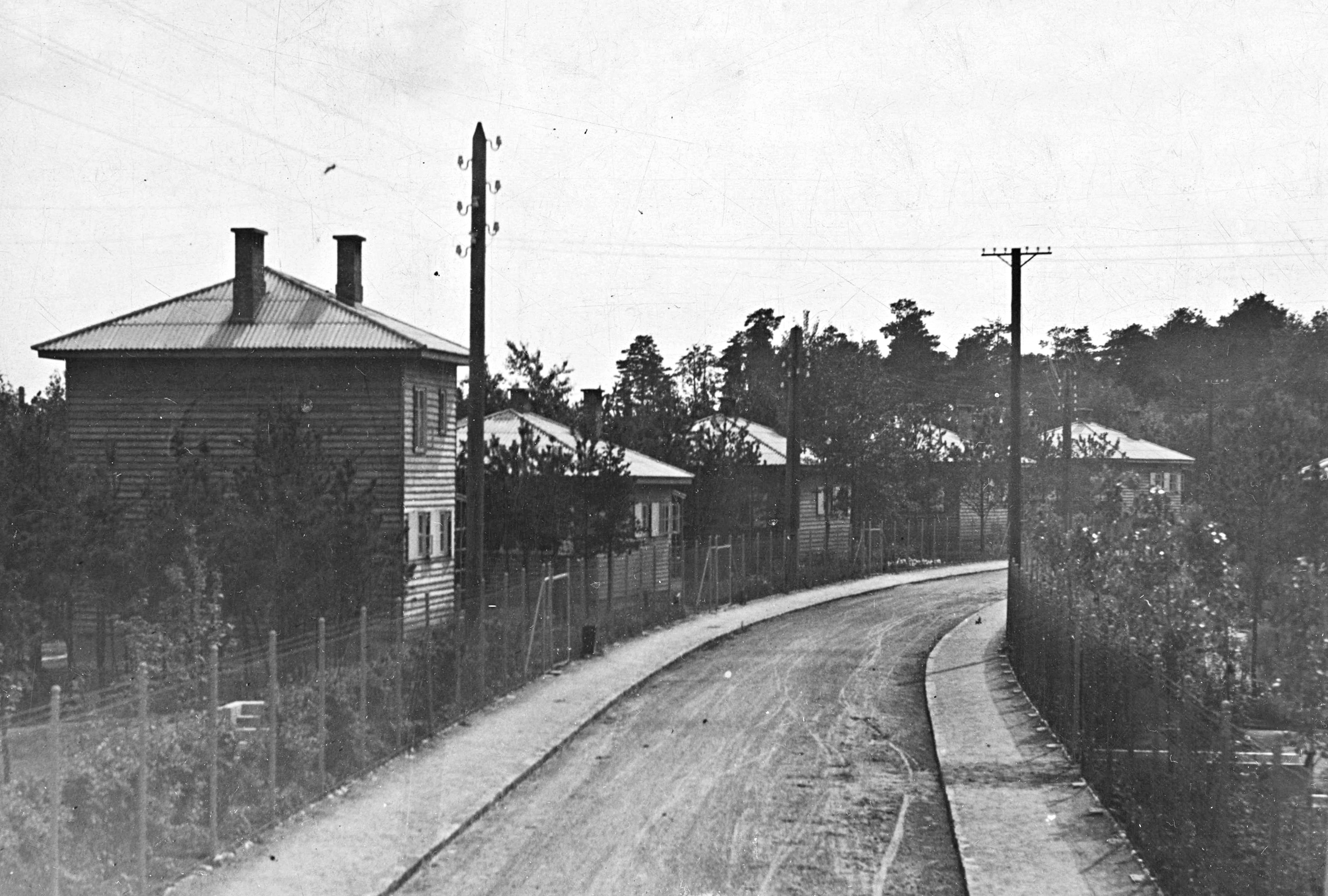
Bawełniana Street in Boernerowo in 1939.

The creation of the neighbourhood, named Osiedle Łączności (Neighbourhood of Communications), was initiated in 1932 by Ignacy Boerner, the Minister of Post and Telegraphs, to combat the rising housing crisis in the city and create homes for the employees of the nearby Transatlantic Radiotelegraph Exchange.

The association which managed the construction and upkeep of the settlement, the Society for the Support of the Constitution of Neighbourhood for Employees of the Communications Service, was founded on 29 April 1932. It was decided to develop a housing estate on an area of 52.41 hectares, with 284 plots ranging in size from 700 to 1500 m^{2} in an urban layout designed by Adam Kuncewicz and Adam Jurewicz. The estate consisted of detached houses made from wood, to provide affordable housing and keep construction costs low. The construction began in July 1933, and by 1939, the neighbourhood included 275 houses and several other buildings, such as a school, a Catholic chapel, and stores. It had a permanent population of around 1,500 people.

In 1933, Ignacy Boerner founded the Association of the Brotherly Help to the Veterans of the Fight for Independence, to develop housing for the veterans of wars for Polish independence between 1863 and 1920. It was developed next to Osiedle Łączności, in the form of the estate of Kolonia im. Aleksandry Piłsudskiej (Aleksandra Piłsudska Colony), located to between, Kleeberga Street (then Piłsudskiej Street), Boernera Street, and Warszawska Street. On 18 October 1934, sixteen house were given to the veterans and their families, in total, counting 63 people. Additionally, in 1936, a house was given to Władysław Mamert Wandalli, a hoaxer, then considered to be the oldest living veteran of the January Uprising, with claims about his age and service are now considered to be debunked. By 1937, the estate had 44 identical houses, each with a floor area of 85 m^{2}. In 1936, the settlement was incorporated into Osiedle Łączności.

Additionally, between 1932 and 1935, the Management of Post and Telegraphs built 29 houses in Boernerowo, to rent them to its employees.

In October 1933, Boernerowo became connected to Ulrychów via a tram line, originally designed as B, and later also called A22 and B22. Its tracks went through Księcia Janusza Street and Obozoba Street, connecting to Boernerowo via a road next to the Bem Fort. It operated until the outbreak of the Warsaw Uprising in 1944, and was reactivated in 1946, as line 20. In 1950, it was replaced by a new line on Dywizjonu 303 and Kaliskiego Streets. In 2011, it was shortened to Kaliskiego Street.

In 1933, a village assembly (gromada) with the seat in Osiedle Łączności was founded as a subdivision of the municipality of Młociny. On 1 January 1936, it was transferred to the municipality of Blizne, and on 27 April, Osiedle Łączności was put under the jurisdiction of the village assembly of Radiostacja.

On 28 September 1936, the settlement was renamed to Boernerowo in honour of Ignacy Boerner. On 2 October, the village assembly adopted the same name.

The first mayor (sołtys) of Boernerowo was Jan Sztromajer, who was replaced after the outbreak of the Second World War, by Władysław Graff.

=== Second World War ===
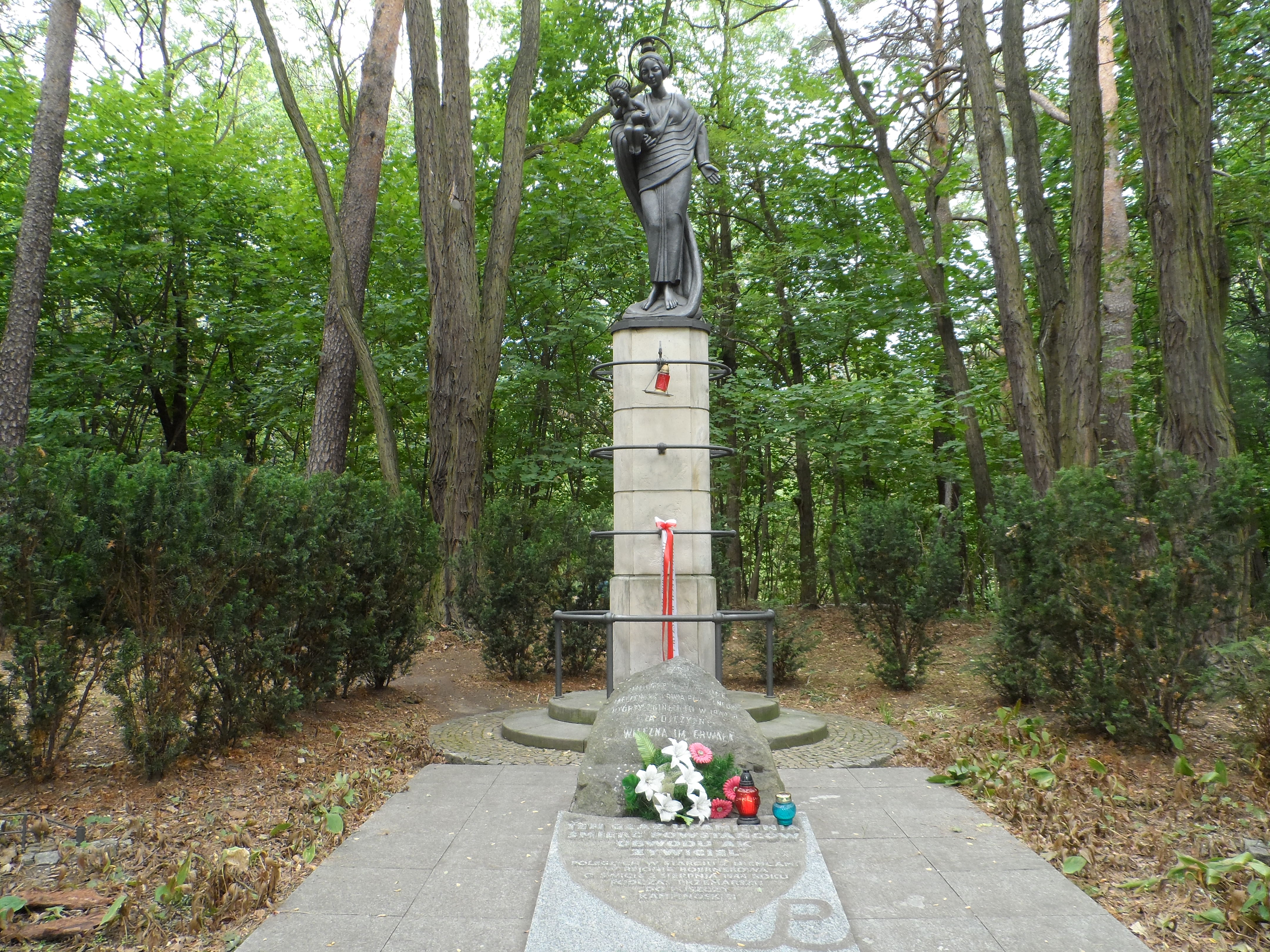
The monument commemorating the battle of Boernerowo of 1944.

On 1 September 1939, on the first day of the German invasion of Poland which began the Second World War, Boernerowo was bombed by the German Air Force. During the siege of Warsaw, the settlement was defended by the 3rd Battalion of the 26 Infantry Regiment of the 5th Infantry Division of the Polish Land Forces, commanded by major Jacek Decowski. German forces captured the settlement on 10 September, and later it was recaptured by Polish soldiers at the night of 14 and 15 September. On 16 September the 3rd Battalion, together with the 3rd battery of the 54th Artillery Regiment, moved to the Fort IIA, which they defended from heavy attacks on 17 and 18 September. The next day, the battalion attacked the village of Janów, while German forces began an attack on Boernerowo coming from Stare Babice. From 23 to 24 September, German artillery fired towards Boernerowo. On 27 September, German forces captured the Fort II in Wawrzyszew, exposing Polish positions, and surrounding the 3rd Battalion from the north, capturing the Swedish Mountains. On the same day, the 19th Infantry Division of the German Army captured Boernerowo and the Transatlantic Radiotelegraph Exchange, following the heavy fighting. The battalion suffered devastating losses, with the remaining survivors being captured. Overall, around 85 to 90% of the soldiers of the 3rd Battalion were killed during the siege of Warsaw.

In December 1939, while under the German occupation, the 7th Legions Infantry Regiment formed the underground resistance group Madagascar, later renamed Garłuch in 1942. It had its base of operations in Boernerowo, in a house at 11 Boernera Street. Lieutenant Henryk Malec became its commander and was replaced in 1942 by deputy lieutenant Władysław Kłodziński. It became one of the largest groups of Polish resistance, and the main unit operating in the area. In 1941, Tadeusz Towarnick founded the insurgent group Wapiennik, also known as division unit 993/W, with its base of operations in a house at 15 Parkowa Street. Both groups carried out numerous military and sabotage operations against German occupiers and their collaborators.

On 6 January 1940, German officers executed and buried 96 people at the nearby Swedish Mountains. It was one of the earliest mass executions committed in Poland during the conflict. The identity of the victims remains unknown.

Throughout the war, beginning in 1940, in the house of general Michał Tokarzewski-Karaszewicz, founder of the Service for Poland's Victory, at 18 Telfoniczna Street, operated a secret radio station. Moreover, in Boernerowo were also present a secret printing press of siblings Zofia and Stefan Ligowski, used by the resistance to manufacture their press, falsified documents, lists of people murdered by German officers, among others. A secret intelligence group The Musketeers also had its hiding place for documents and information gathered by them in Boernerowo, which later was used by other resistance organisations.

Several inhabitants of Boernerowo hid Jewish people in their houses. This included Bronisław Przybysz, who on 1 February 1944, was executed by German officers, together with his family, and a Jewish couple and their two children, whom he had hidden in his house. He was posthumously awarded the title of the Righteous Among the Nations in 1991. It was also given to Stanisław Śwital, Zbigniew Ściwiarski, and Janusz Osęka, for managing to escort seven insurgents of the Jewish Combat Organization on 15 November 1944, from the Old Town to Boernerowo. They were carried on stretchers through German border points, under the cover story of suffering from the typhoid fever.

On 2 August 1944, a resistance company of around 100 soldiers, led by Jerzy Terczyński, cryptonym Straż (Guard), was attacked by the occupant soldiers to the north of Boernerowo. The unit was retreating from Żoliborz and Bielany, while being separated and without means of communication with the rest of the insurgent forces. Polish soldiers, while in an open field, were ambushed and surrounded by German forces and shot at with machine guns. Additionally, they were shot at and rammed by a German tank. Over 70 resistance soldiers were killed, with a small number managing to escape, and a few being captured and executed afterwards. The German side suffered a few casualties and injuries.

Through the conflict, hundreds of people moved from Warsaw to Boernerowo in search of refuge after losing their houses due to bombings or expulsion. Due to this, the population of the settlement doubled from around 1,500 to 3,000 people, with new arrivals being taken in by the local inhabitants. During and after the destruction of Warsaw, Władysław Graff, the mayor of Boernerowo, issued the backdated resident registration documents to the refugees. It was done at risk to himself and his family, as, according to German law, sheltering potential insurgents would be punished by death.

After the settlement was captured by the Red Army, on 17 January 1945, the People's Commissariat for Internal Affairs of the Soviet Union, set up a base in a former provisional precinct of the Blue Police in a house at 38/38A Dostepna Street. They began to capture soldiers of the Home Army operating in the area and held them in a jail in the house basement. Some soldiers of Garłuch kept activity within the area, engaging in resistance against the Soviet Union, including freeing some of the prisoners.

=== After the Second World War ===
On 31 January 1947, the settlement, and the village assembly, were renamed to Bemowo, in honour of Józef Bem, an 18th- and 19th-century engineer and military officer, and veteran of the November Uprising, whom in 1921, became a patron of the nearby Bem Fort (previously Fort Parysów).

On 14 May 1951, the area was incorporated into the city of Warsaw, becoming part of the Wola district. On 29 December 1989, following an administrative reform in the city, it became part of the municipality of Warsaw-Wola, and on 25 March 1994, of the municipality of Warsaw-Bemowo, which, on 27 October 2002, was restructured into the city district of Bemowo. In 1997, it was subdivided into ten areas of the City Information System, with Boernerowo becoming one of them.

In 1945, the government requisitioned several houses in Boernerowo, in order to turn them into barracks for the officers of the Internal Security Corps, a special-purpose military formation of the Ministry of Public Security. The unit itself had its headquarters in the neighbourhood until 10 August 1945, when it moved to 4/6/8 Puławska Street in Mokotów. The requisition of the neighbourhood was announced in 1946, and put into the law in 1949, distributing the land between the Ministry of Public Security, Military University of Technology, and 1st Airborne Fighter Regiment. Acquired houses were renovated, mostly resulting in their partition into smaller units, and assigned to the officers and stuff of the aforementioned organizations.

The residents began being evicted in February 1951, although it remained not officially sanctioned by the government until 4 June 1952, and lasted until the end of 1953. Some of the previous owners and residents were arrested, or disappeared in unknown circumstances, as well as being tortured in prisons. Additionally, in 1952, the land in Kolonia im. Aleksandry Piłsudskiej was also requisitioned, and organization which owned it, the Association of the Brotherly Help to the Veterans of the Fight for Independence, forcibly disbanded in 1955. On 1 February 1959, the National Council of Warsaw passed a resolution, allowing former owners to officially petition for the return of their property. However, in practice, the process was made intentionally different or impossible by the government clerks. Moreover, many of the houses were instead sold by the government for symbolic 1 złoty to new residents, without the knowledge of the previous owners. Numerous previous owners never regained their property, and many of the houses still belong to the government. Additionally, in 1971, it was allowed for the formal property of the Association of the Brotherly Help to the Veterans of the Fight for Independence, to be sold back to its members.

Between 1946 and 1950, to the north of Boernerowo was constructed the Warsaw Babice Airport, developed on former dirt runway airfield used since in 1916, and a portion of land was requisitioned from the neighbourhood. Run by the military, it remained a restricted and classified area until 1957. It was partially opened to civilian use in 1991. Additionally, in 1951, to the southeast from Boernerowo, at 2 Kaliskiego Street, was founded the Military University of Technology.

In the 1960s, between Ebro, Sobczaka, and Telewizyjna Streets, was developed a small housing estate of Bemowo, with detached and semi-detached houses. In the 1990s, within Boernerowo was also considered a housing cooperative estate of Kalenica.

In 1971, at 49 Kaliskiego Street, in place of the former chapel, was built the Church of Our Lady of the Sharp Gate.

In 1987, the neighbourhood was renamed back to Boernerowo.

In 2007, the monument dedicated to Ignacy Boerner was unveiled at the corner of Kaliskiego and Kutrzeby Streets.

In 2013, its 62 historic wooden houses and urban layout were placed onto the heritage list.

== Characteristics ==
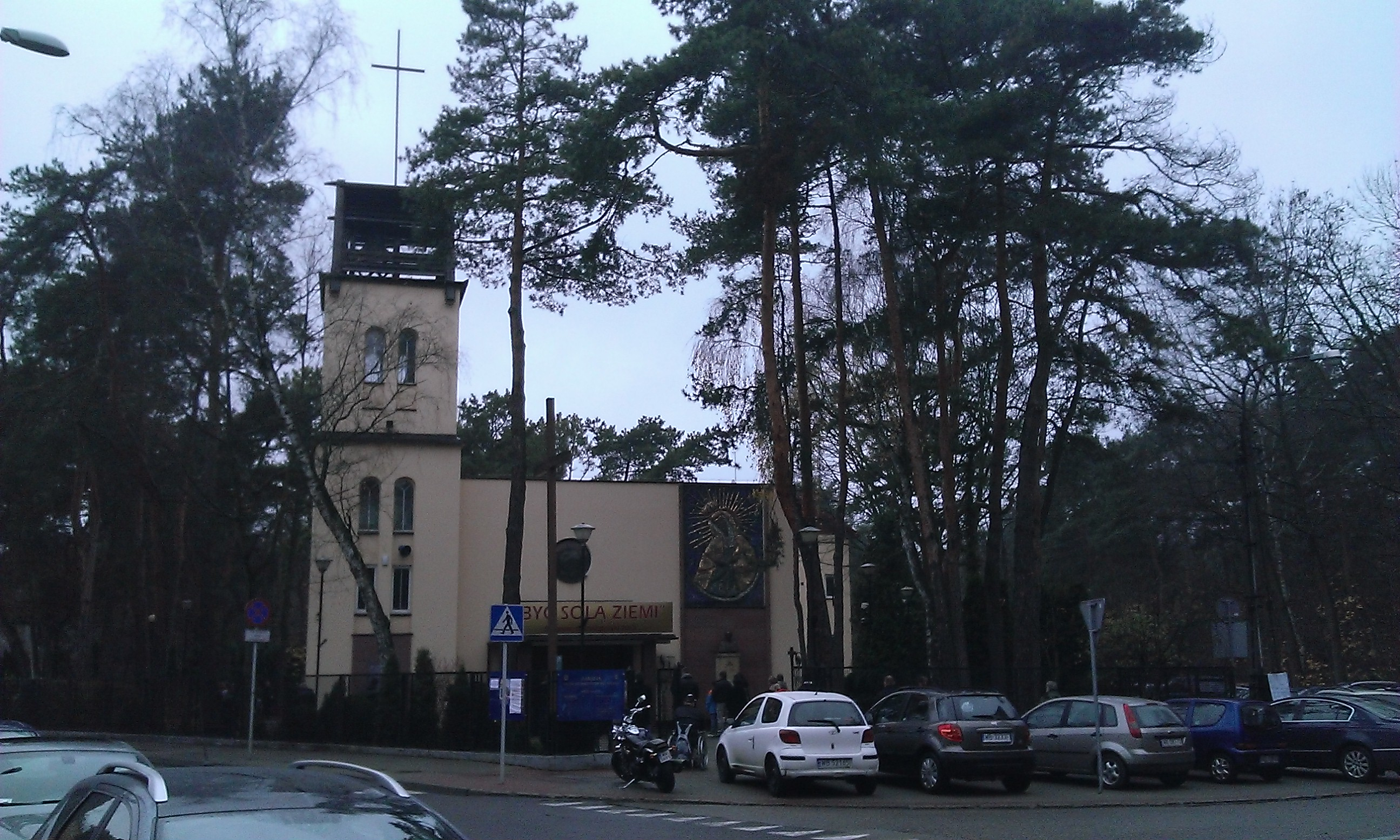
The Church of Our Lady of the Sharp Gate in Boernerowo.

Boernerowo is a housing estate of detached and semi-detached houses. It includes 62 wooden houses dating to the 1930s, which, together with its historic urban layout, are included on the national heritage list. The neighbourhood is connected with Wola via a tramway.

At 49 Kaliskiego Street, is placed the Church Our Lady of the Sharp Gate, which operates as a civilian and military parish church of Catholic devotion. Next to it is also located the Bemowo Cemetery.

To the north of Boernerowo is located the Warsaw Babice Airport.

== Boundaries ==
Boernerowo is one of the areas of the City Information System, a municipal standardized street signage system. Its borders are determined by Dostępna, Radiowa, and Grotowska Streets, and boundaries of the Warsaw Babice Airport. It borders Lotnisko, Bemowo-Lotnisko, and Fort Radiowo.
