= Battle of Boernerowo =

Battle between Polish Home Army and German forces near Boernerowo

- Part of World War II, Warsaw Uprising
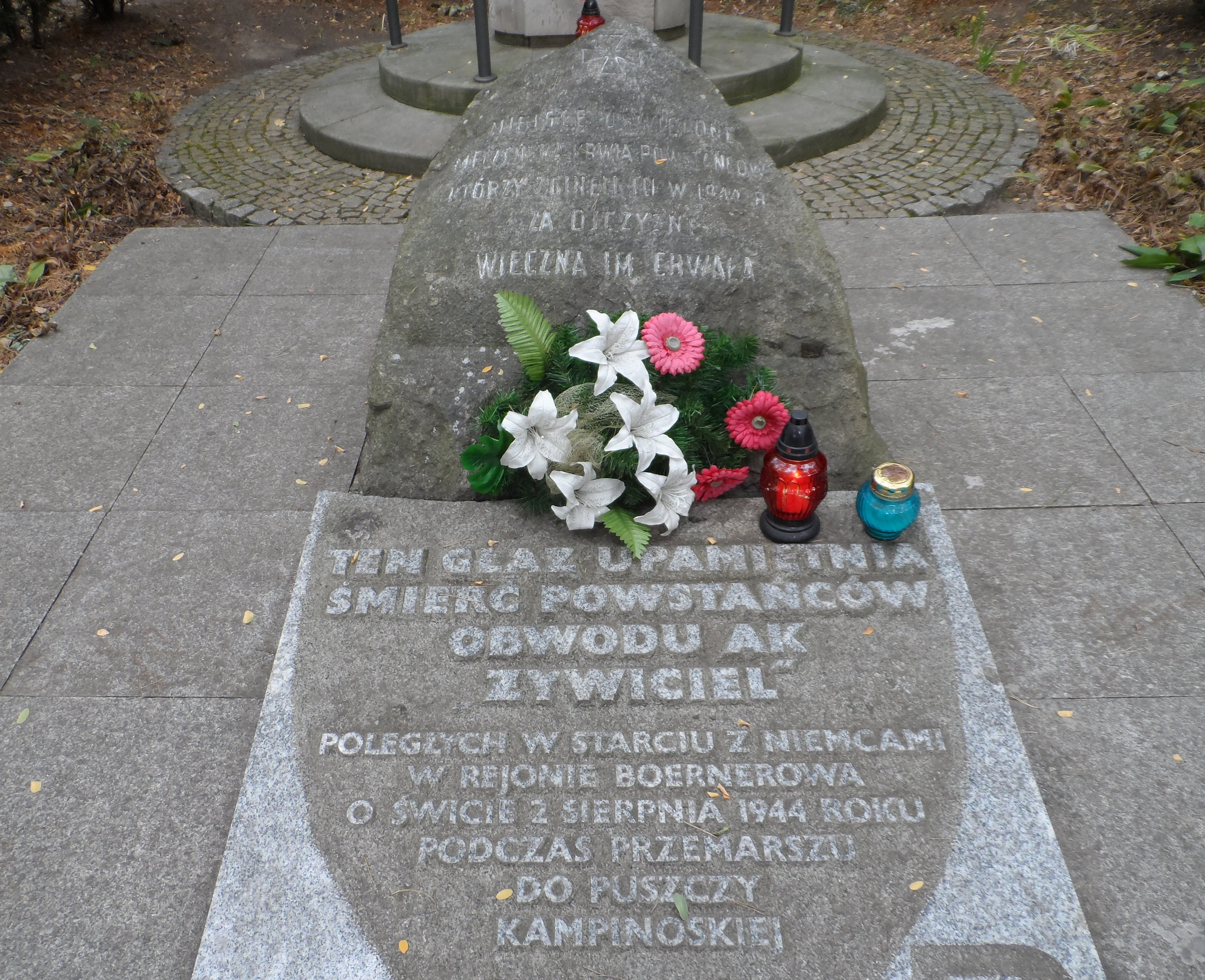
- Boulder and plaque at 15 Grotowska Street in Boernerowo commemorating Home Army soldiers killed on 2 August 1944
Date	2 August 1944
Location	Boernerowo, General Government, Germany (now part of Poland)
Result	German victory
Territorial changes	Poland under German occupation

Belligerents
(Poland) Home Army	Germany

Commanders and leaders
Jerzy Terczyński	Unknown

Strength
Between 120 and 150 soldiers	Unknown

Casualties and losses
73–100 killed	Several killed and wounded

The Battle of Boernerowo, also known as the Boernerowo massacre, was a clash between a Home Army company led by Lieutenant Jerzy Terczyński, codenamed Starża, and a subunit of the German 1st Fallschirm-Panzer Division Hermann Göring. The battle occurred on the morning of 2 August 1944 near the suburban settlement of Boernerowo outside Warsaw, resulting in the destruction of the Polish unit and the death of most of its soldiers.

On the first day of the Warsaw Uprising, units of the Home Army's Żoliborz Subdistrict attacked German positions in Żoliborz and Bielany, but nearly all assaults were repelled with heavy losses. As a result, the district commander, Lieutenant Colonel Mieczysław Niedzielski, codenamed Żywiciel, decided on the evening of 1 August to withdraw his troops to the nearby Kampinos Forest. Lieutenant Starża's company, having lost contact with other units, began an independent retreat and was ambushed and destroyed by German forces at Boernerowo on the morning of 2 August. At least 73 Home Army soldiers perished in the unequal fight.

== Background ==
The Third Sector of Home Army's Żoliborz Subdistrict covered the Bielany area of Warsaw. One of its four line companies was the 2nd Company, commanded by Lieutenant Jerzy Terczyński, codenamed Starża. Formed in the second half of 1943 under the leadership of sector commander Captain Władysław Nowakowski, codenamed Jeleń/Żubr, the company grew due to increased recruitment in Bielany's Home Army structures. At the outbreak of the Warsaw Uprising, the company comprised three platoons: Platoon 212, led by Cadet Officer Czesław Kubzdela, codenamed Kuba; Platoon 237, commanded by Second Lieutenant Jerzy Mieczyński, codenamed Dunin; and Platoon 239, led by Second Lieutenant Zdzisław Grunwald, codenamed Zych. Many of its members were university-educated or students, earning the company the nickname "Academic Legion".

The uprising plans designated one of Starża's platoons, supported by assault sappers, to attack the "Tailoring School" buildings at 66 Zabłocińska/Marymoncka Street during the "W" Hour. The other two platoons, backed by two sapper sections, were to assault the so-called Waldlager (Note: A complex of 12 one- and two-story barracks defending the approach to the University of Physical Education from the east and south, secured by makeshift earthworks and barbed wire fencing (Jasiński (2009, p. 62)).) in Bielany Forest, then advance toward the University of Physical Education at 34 Marymoncka Street.

On the morning of 1 August 1944, Lieutenant Colonel Mieczysław Niedzielski, codenamed Żywiciel, received orders from Home Army's Warsaw District commander, Colonel Antoni Chruściel, codenamed Monter, setting the uprising's start for 5:00 PM. The Żoliborz Subdistrict units began mobilization. Around 2:00 PM, soldiers of the Żniwiarz Group clashed unexpectedly with a German gendarmerie patrol on Krasiński Street, triggering regular fighting across Żoliborz. These unforeseen events cost Żoliborz units the element of surprise, disrupted communications, and isolated the district from the rest of the city. Many soldiers failed to reach assembly points on time, and some weapons and ammunition were not delivered. The situation was similar in the Third Sector, where Captain Żubr's units were cut off from the rest of Żywiciel's forces. Many soldiers did not reach assembly points, and the 3rd Company, led by Second Lieutenant Kwarciany, was entirely isolated in Marymont and could not participate in the assault on Waldlager or the Camaldolese Church in Bielany Forest. As a result, only 400 Third Sector soldiers went into battle at the designated hour. Meanwhile, the Germans significantly reinforced their defenses in Bielany that day, increasing the garrisons of the University of Physical Education, Waldlager, and the Camaldolese Church to about 700 troops, supported by armored cars and tanks.

The 2nd Company assembled at concentration points on Leśna, Kiwerska, and Rajszewska streets. Due to significant absences and severe shortages of weapons, Lieutenant Starża modified the original plans, opting to attack Waldlager with his entire force. The assault launched from Podleśna Street. The left-flank Platoon 212 failed to cross a several-hundred-meter open stretch and was pinned down by machine-gun fire halfway. The other two platoons reached the edge of Bielany Forest but were halted by enemy fire and retreated after several minutes. Without contact with higher command, Starża attempted a second assault on Waldlager, likely hoping for support from other Third Sector units. This attempt also failed, forcing Starża to withdraw the company to its starting positions.

The uprising in Żoliborz on that day ended in near-total failure. Home Army units captured none of their key objectives, suffered heavy losses in personnel and equipment, and lost contact with district command. Under these circumstances, Lieutenant Colonel Żywiciel, persuaded by his officers, decided during an evening briefing to withdraw all Żoliborz Home Army units to Kampinos Forest. He expected all units to be ready to march by 12:30 AM on 2 August. However, due to chaos and insubordination by some officers, the retreat was not coordinated. By 10:30 PM, most units of the Fourth Sector (Powązki) left the city without waiting for the full assembly of district forces. Shortly afterward, Captain Żubr and most Third Sector units also departed for Kampinos Forest on their own.

== Destruction of Starża's company at Boernerowo ==
After the failed attack on Waldlager, the 2nd Company returned to its starting positions and saw no significant combat for the rest of the day. For several hours, Lieutenant Starża unsuccessfully tried to contact higher command or neighboring units. Around midnight, a courier from Captain Żubr delivered orders to retreat to Kampinos Forest. Starża promptly organized a muster and led his soldiers to Zuga Street, the designated assembly point for Third Sector units. A four-man rear guard under Cadet Officer Jan Ogulewicz, codenamed Boy, remained at Podleśna Street. (Note: Maciej Bernhardt, codenamed Zdzich, claimed that Ogulewicz's squad did not join the main force because it was not informed of the retreat. However, Boy stated in his memoirs that he and his men stayed at Podleśna Street on Starża's orders. Around 1:00 AM on 2 August, a courier from Starża led the group to Zdobycz Robotnicza district. That afternoon, Maciej Bernhardt joined them, bringing news of the near-total destruction of the company at Boernerowo (Grunwald (1993, p. 61); Bernhardt (2009, pp. 200, 211–212)).)

Upon arriving at Zuga Street, Starża learned that Captain Żubr had already left for Kampinos Forest without waiting for the remaining units. Starża decided to leave the wounded at the "Nasz Dom" shelter at 42/44 Confederation Square and follow the main Third Sector forces. The march began around 2:00 AM. Second Lieutenant Zdzisław Grunwald, codenamed Zych, led the vanguard, followed by Platoons 212 and 239 with Starża at the head. The rearguard was Platoon 237, commanded by Second Lieutenant Jerzy Mieczyński, codenamed Dunin. Zdzisław Grunwald estimated the column at about 120 soldiers. Maciej Bernhardt reported that Starża led between 130 and 150 people, including some civilians, possibly unarmed volunteers. On one of the streets in Zdobycz Robotnicza district, the soldiers found abandoned German trucks filled with cigarettes and canned food. After leaving the city, the company marched through sandy dunes known as Szwedzkie Góry, guided by the 126.5-meter right mast of the Babice transatlantic radio station. Just before dawn, they reached a cobblestone road connecting the Boernerowo telecommunications settlement to the village of Wawrzyszew.

At that time, strong enemy forces were stationed in the Boernerowo area. The settlement was occupied by about 100 Ukrainian collaborators guarding auxiliary Luftwaffe workshops (Nebenwerkstatt der Luftwaffe). A subunit of the 1st Fallschirm-Panzer Division Hermann Göring was quartered in nearby Fort II "Wawrzyszew". Maciej Bernhardt believed that Starża underestimated these threats when choosing the retreat route, as Home Army intelligence had reported the presence of a German armored unit near Boernerowo days before the uprising.

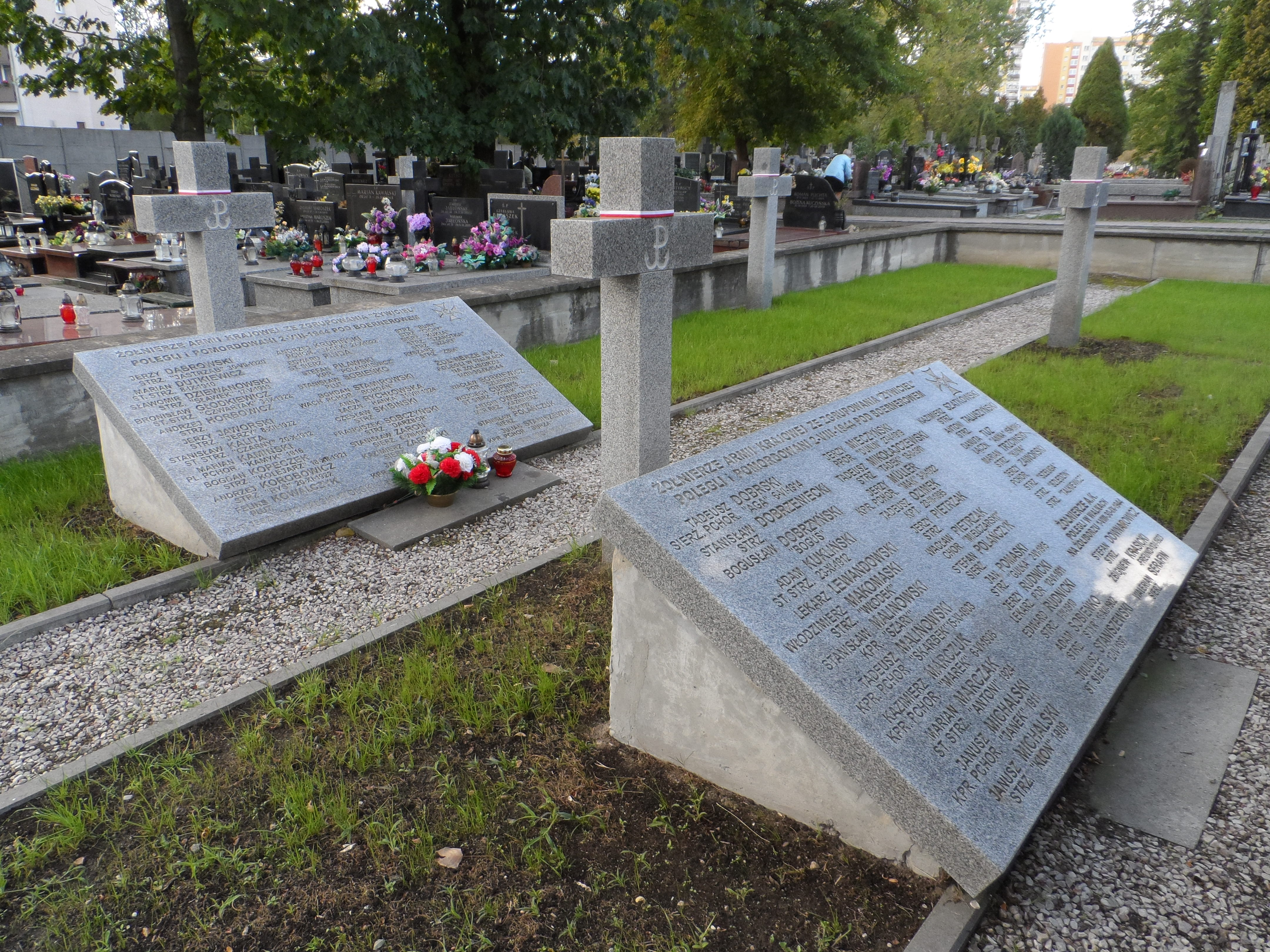
Graves of Home Army soldiers killed in the Battle of Boernerowo, Wawrzyszew Cemetery

The Polish vanguard crossed the road without incident, but the main force was suddenly met with heavy machine-gun fire from both sides. In this critical situation, escape was the only chance for survival, but despite Starża's orders, most inexperienced insurgents took cover in open fields, hiding behind haystacks or natural terrain dips. Second Lieutenant Dunin, commanding the rearguard, ordered his platoon to retreat to Bielany, but only a few soldiers escaped the battlefield. Some followed the main force across the road. The Germans quickly surrounded the Polish company, and a tank (Note: Some accounts mention two German tanks in the battle (Podlewski (1979, p. 66)).) arrived from Boernerowo, systematically killing survivors with turret fire or crushing them with its tracks.

Within an hour, the battle was over. A group of ten, including Starża and Zych, survived, along with an undetermined number of individual insurgents. Some vanguard soldiers were captured. The Germans forced the prisoners to dig two large graves on the battlefield, filling one with the bodies of their fallen comrades. After the first grave was filled and leveled, the prisoners were led to the edge of the second grave and executed.

On the morning of 2 August 1944, approximately 100 soldiers of Starża's company were likely killed at Boernerowo. German losses were limited to a few killed and wounded. By 2009, Janusz Tryliński identified the names of 64 fallen and executed insurgents and the pseudonyms of nine others. Among the dead were Second Lieutenant Jerzy Mieczyński, codenamed Dunin (Platoon 237 commander), Senior Sergeant Aleksander Michalak, codenamed Gruby (deputy commander of Platoon 212), Cadet Officer Władysław Rode, codenamed Rewski (deputy commander of Platoon 239), Cadet Officer Bohdan Staromirowski, codenamed Bohdan (deputy commander of Platoon 237), and most squad leaders.

== Commemoration ==
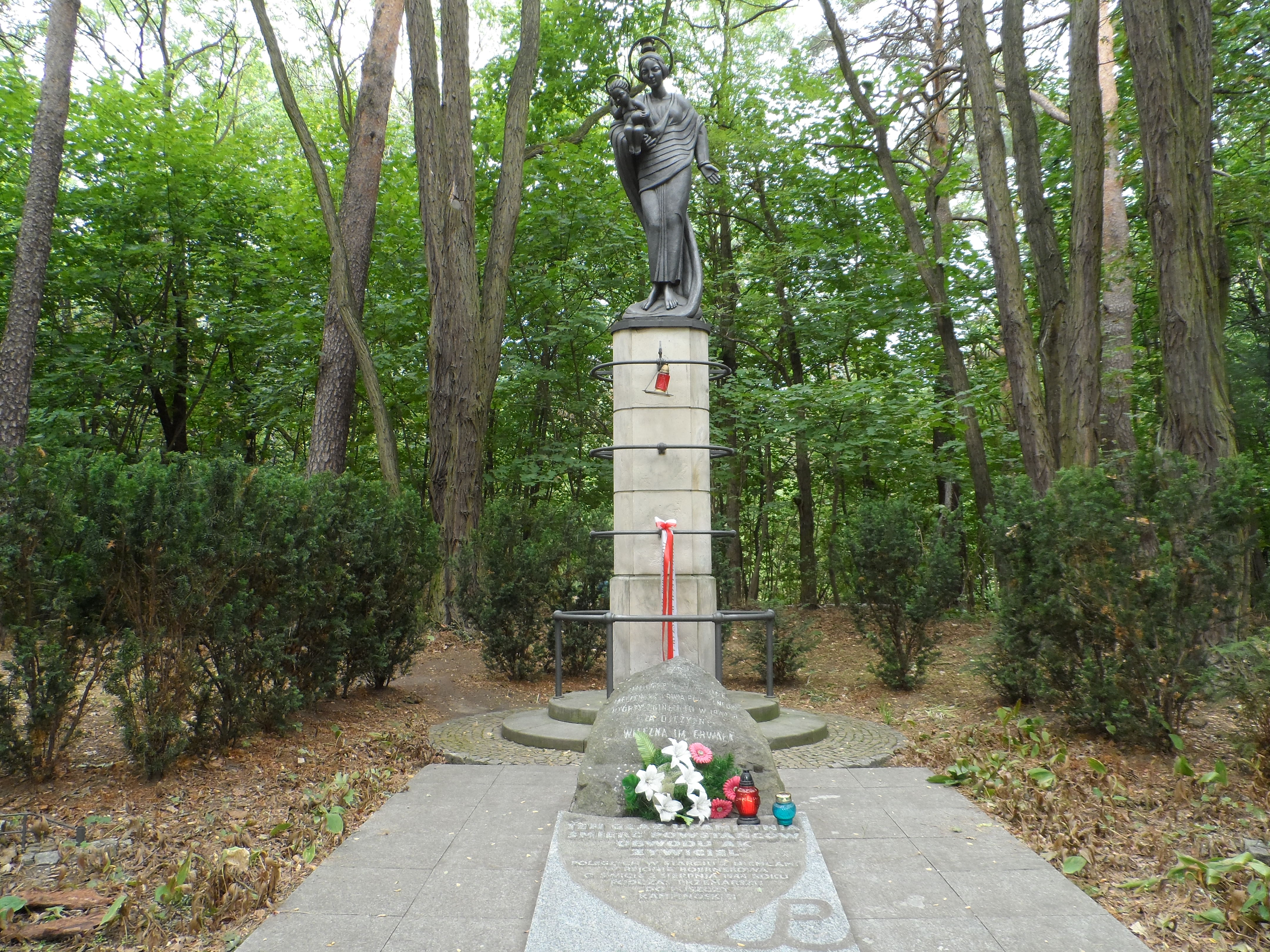
Memorial site at 15 Grotowska Street in Boernerowo, with a statue of the Virgin Mary and Child by Jan Goliński in the background

In May 1945, families of the fallen conducted private exhumations of some insurgent graves at Boernerowo, recovering about a dozen bodies buried in various Warsaw and suburban cemeteries. From 12 to 15 November 1945, the Polish Red Cross exhumed 60 bodies (52 men, 7 women, 1 unidentified) from two large graves and several smaller ones, which were then buried at the Wawrzyszew Cemetery.

On 4 August 1946, a commemorative boulder was solemnly dedicated near the emptied graves. It bore the inscription:

A place sanctified by the martyr's blood of insurgents who died here in 1944 for the Homeland
Eternal glory to them

In 1949, due to the construction of a military airport in Bemowo, the boulder was relocated to the corner of Grotowska and Westerplatte streets in Boernerowo, in front of a statue of the Virgin Mary and Child by Jan Goliński. In the 1990s, the memorial site was enhanced with a plaque reading:

This boulder commemorates the death of insurgents of the Home Army Żywiciel District killed in the battle with Germans near Boernerowo at dawn on 2 August 1944 during the march to Kampinos Forest

== See also ==
- Battle of Pęcice

== Bibliography ==
- Bernhardt, Maciej (2009). Z Miodowej na Bracką. Opowieść powstańca warszawskiego [From Miodowa to Bracka: A Warsaw Uprising Insurgent's Story] (in Polish). Kraków: i-Press Piotr Pielach. ISBN 978-83-925052-7-3.
- Grunwald, Zdzisław (1993). "Żubry" na Żoliborzu. Wspomnienia żołnierzy powstania warszawskiego ["Bisons" in Żoliborz: Memoirs of Warsaw Uprising Soldiers] (in Polish). Warsaw: Żywiciel. ISBN 83-901201-0-0.
- Jasiński, Grzegorz (2009). Żoliborz 1944 (in Polish). Pruszków: Ajaks. ISBN 978-83-62046-03-4.
- Podlewski, Stanisław (1979). Rapsodia żoliborska [Żoliborz Rhapsody] (in Polish). Warsaw: Pax. ISBN 83-211-0009-0.
