= Ignacy Boerner Memorial =

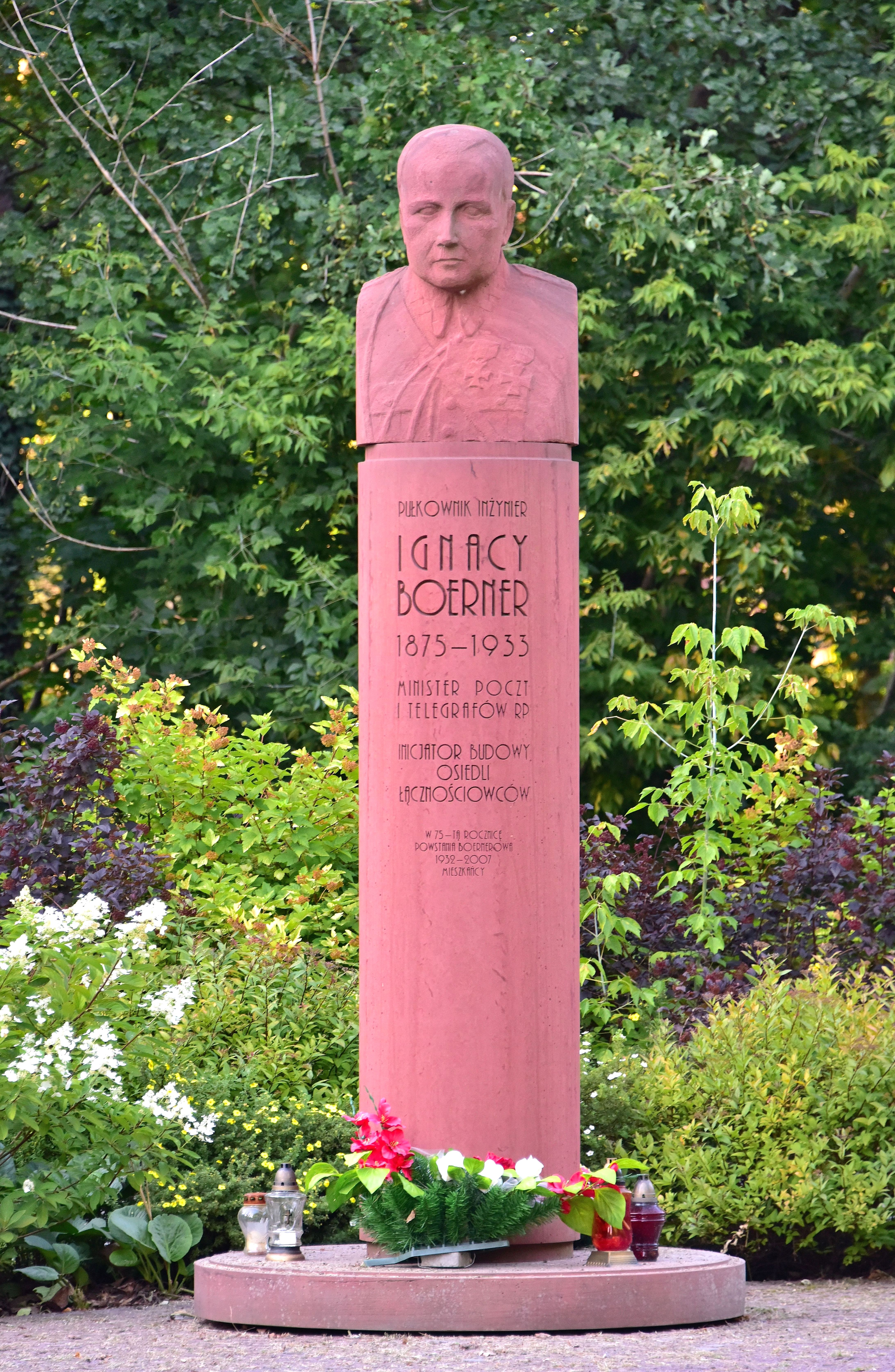
- The monument in 2018.
- Interactive map of Ignacy Boerner Memorial
- Location: Boerner Square, Bemowo, Warsaw, Poland
- Coordinates: 52.262707°N 20.898406°E
- Type: Bust
- Opening date: 17 November 2007
- Dedicated to: Ignacy Boerner

The Ignacy Boerner Memorial (Polish: Pomnik Ignacego Boernera) is a modernist monument in Warsaw, Poland, placed at the corner of Kaliskiego and Kutrzeby Streets, in the Boernerowo neighbourhood of the Bemowo district. The modernist bust sculpture is dedicated to Ignacy Boerner, a military officer and politician, who was the Minister of Post and Telegraphs of Poland from 1929 to 1933, and the founder of Boernerowo. The monument was unveiled on 17 November 2007.

== History ==
On 11 November 1988, a commemorative plaque dedicated to Ignacy Boerner, was unveiled at the corner of Kaliskiego and Kutrzeby Streets, in the neighbourhood of Boernerowo. On 17 November 2007, it was replaced with a modernist monument consisting of a bust of Boerner. On 17 April 2008, the garden square, on which the monument stands, was named after Boerner, in commemoration of the 70th anniversary of his death.

== Overview ==
The monument is placed at the Colonel Ignacy Boerner Square (Polish: Skwer płk. Ignacego Boernera) at the corner of Kaliskiego and Kutrzeby Streets, in front of the Church of Our Lady of the Sharp Gate. It has the form of a modernist bust of Ignacy Boerner, placed on a cylidrical pedestal. It features a Polish inscription, which reads:

Polish inscription

Pułkownik inżynier
Ignacy
Boerner
1875–1933

Minister Poczt
i Telegrafów RP

Inicjator budowy
Osiedli
Łącznościowców

W 75-tą rocznicę
Powstania Boernerowa
1932–2007
Mieszkańcy

Translation:
English translation

Colonel Engineer
Ignacy
Boerner
1875–1933

The Minister of Post and
Telegraphs of the Republic of Poland

The initiator of the construction of
the Neighbourhoods of
Communications Officers

In the 75th anniversary of
the founding of Boernerowo
1932–2007
The residents
