= PAST (Poland) =

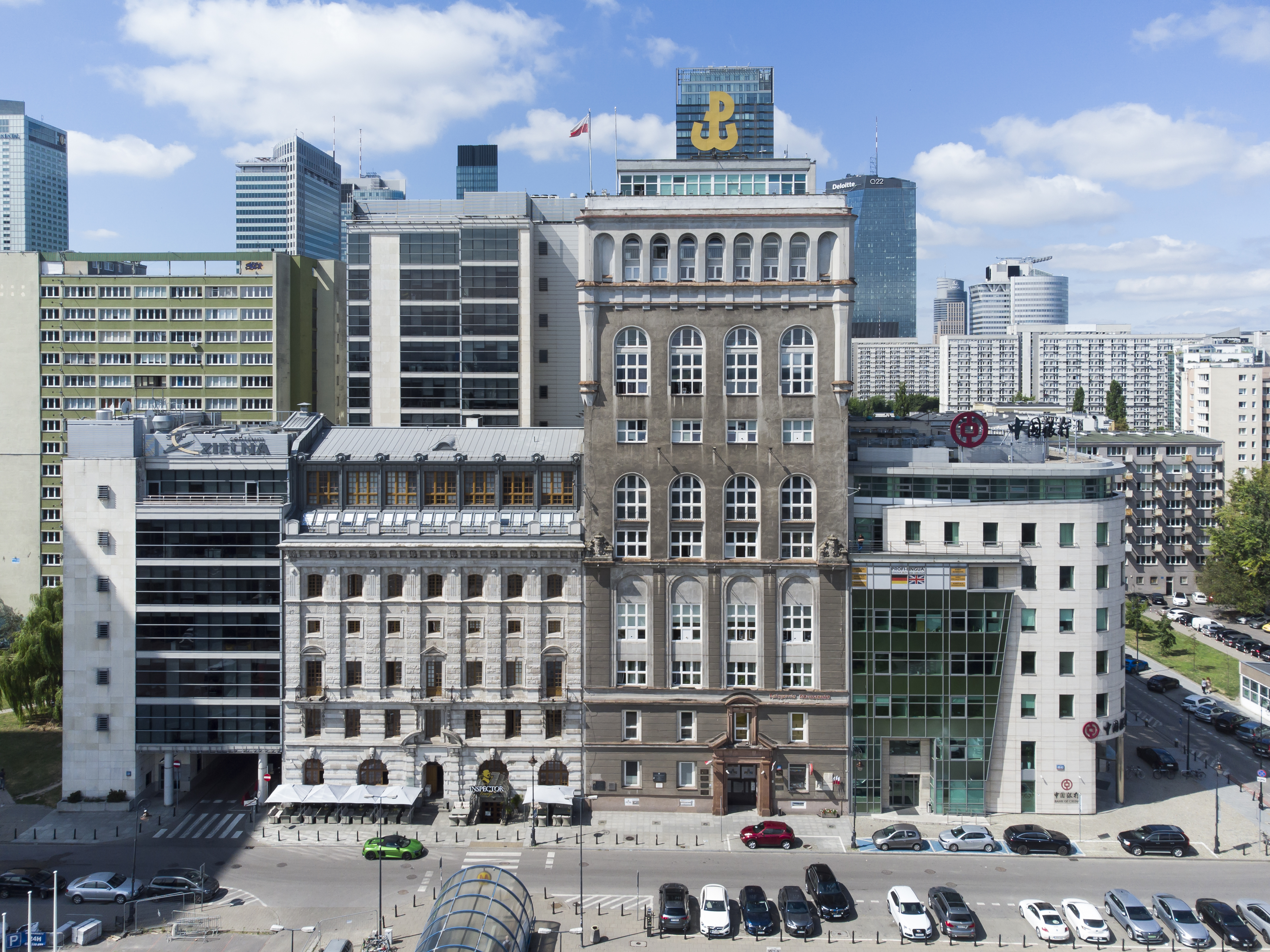
- PAST building in Warsaw, 2024
- Interactive map of the PAST area

General information
- Status: Rebuilt (1950s)
- Architectural style: Historicism
- Location: Warsaw, Poland
- Construction started: 1906
- Completed: 1908
- Demolished: 1944
- Owner: World Association of Home Army Soldiers

Height
- Height: 51.5 m (169 ft)

Technical details
- Floor count: 11

Design and construction
- Architect: Bronisław Brochwicz-Rogoyski

PASTA, also known as PAST-a is the common name for a complex of two buildings located at 37 and 39 Zielna Street in Warsaw, constructed between 1904 and 1910 by the Cedergren Telephone Joint-Stock Company. According to some sources, a single building was constructed in two phases.

The name comes from the initials of the name of the subsequent owner of the property, the PAST (Polska Akcyjna Spółka Telefoniczna; Polish Telephone Joint-Stock Company), less often known as PASTa,

To distinguish the two buildings, the terms "small PASTA" (no. 37) and "large PASTA" (no. 39) are used. Both buildings or just the second one are sometimes referred to as PASTs. The buildings housing the company's district telephone exchanges were also referred to as PASTs. The building was tallest building in Europe in 1908-1911.

It is notable for its main headquarters in the North Downtown (Śródmieście Północne) neighbourhood in Warsaw, which at the time of its completion was the first skyscraper in Poland and the tallest building in Europe. The fight for the building during the Warsaw Uprising of 1944 also added to the legend of the place.

== History ==
The Swedish-owned company Cedergren won a tender in 1900 to expand the Warsaw telephone network. For that purpose, two buildings were built at Zielna Street in downtown Warsaw, holding the telephone exchange and the company's headquarters.

The building was built between 1904 and 1910 and was constructed in two phases. The lower part, designed by L. Wahlman, I.G. Clason and B. Brochowicz-Rogoyski, was completed in 1904-1905; the upper part was added in 1907-1910. The building was one of the first reinforced concrete constructions of its magnitude in Europe.

The Cedergren licence expired in 1922 and the building was consequently taken over by the PAST company. This is why it was referred to by Varsovians either by the name of Cedergren or PAST, or, colloquially, "Pasta" (English: Paste). During the German occupation of Poland, it was the regional telephone centre for General Government. During the Warsaw Uprising, on August 20, 1944, the building was captured by Polish insurgents of AK battalion "Kiliński” after 20 days of bloody fighting. The building was severely damaged. It was rebuilt in a simplified architectural form after World War II. The company was not recreated after the war, and its assets were nationalised by the Polish communist authorities.

The historic Próżna Street is right around the corner of the building.

In 2003, Kotwica, a World War II emblem of the Polish Underground State and Armia Krajowa, was placed on top of the company's former headquarters.

== Gallery ==
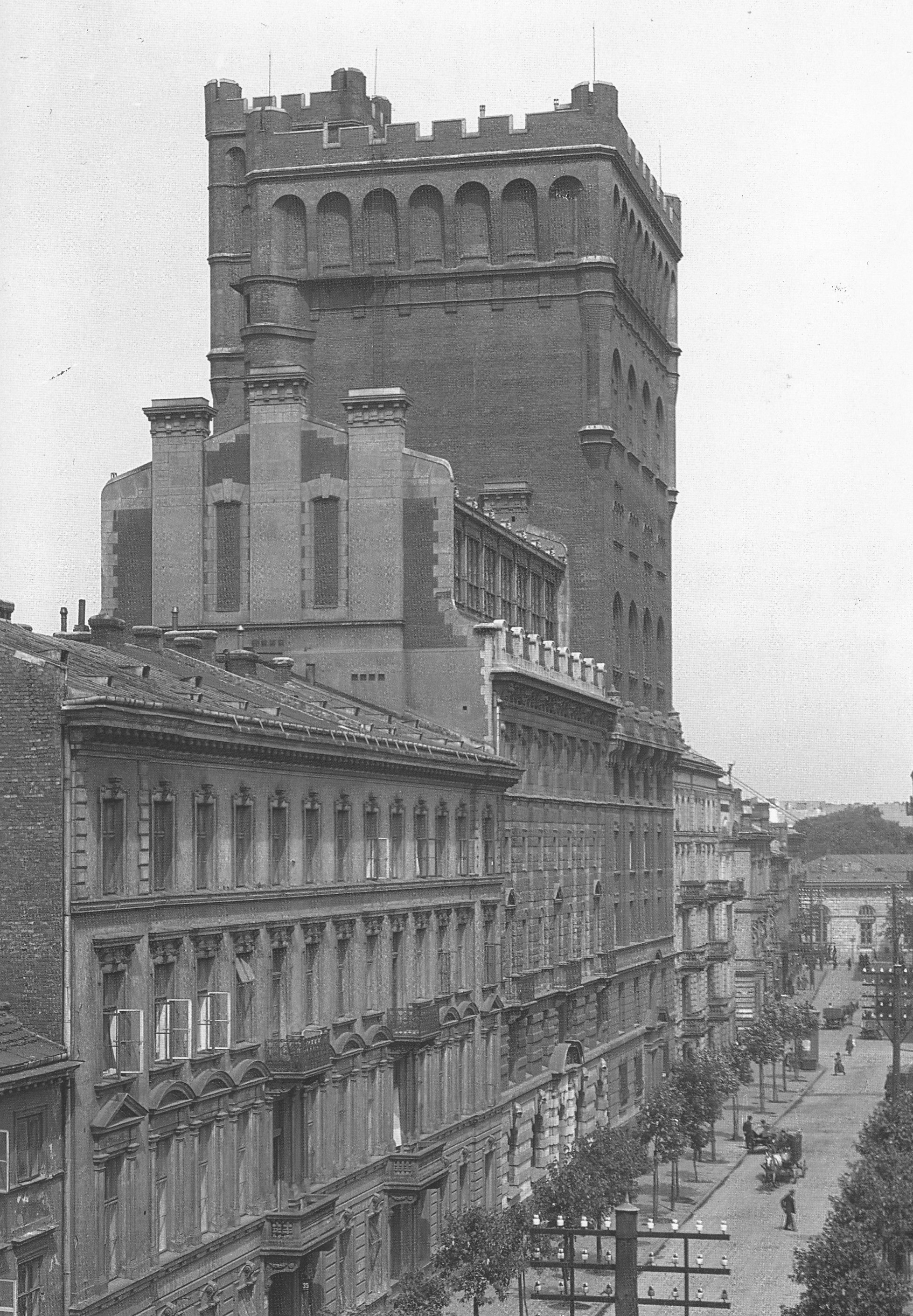
Pre-war look of the Large PAST (background) and Small PAST (foreground) buildings

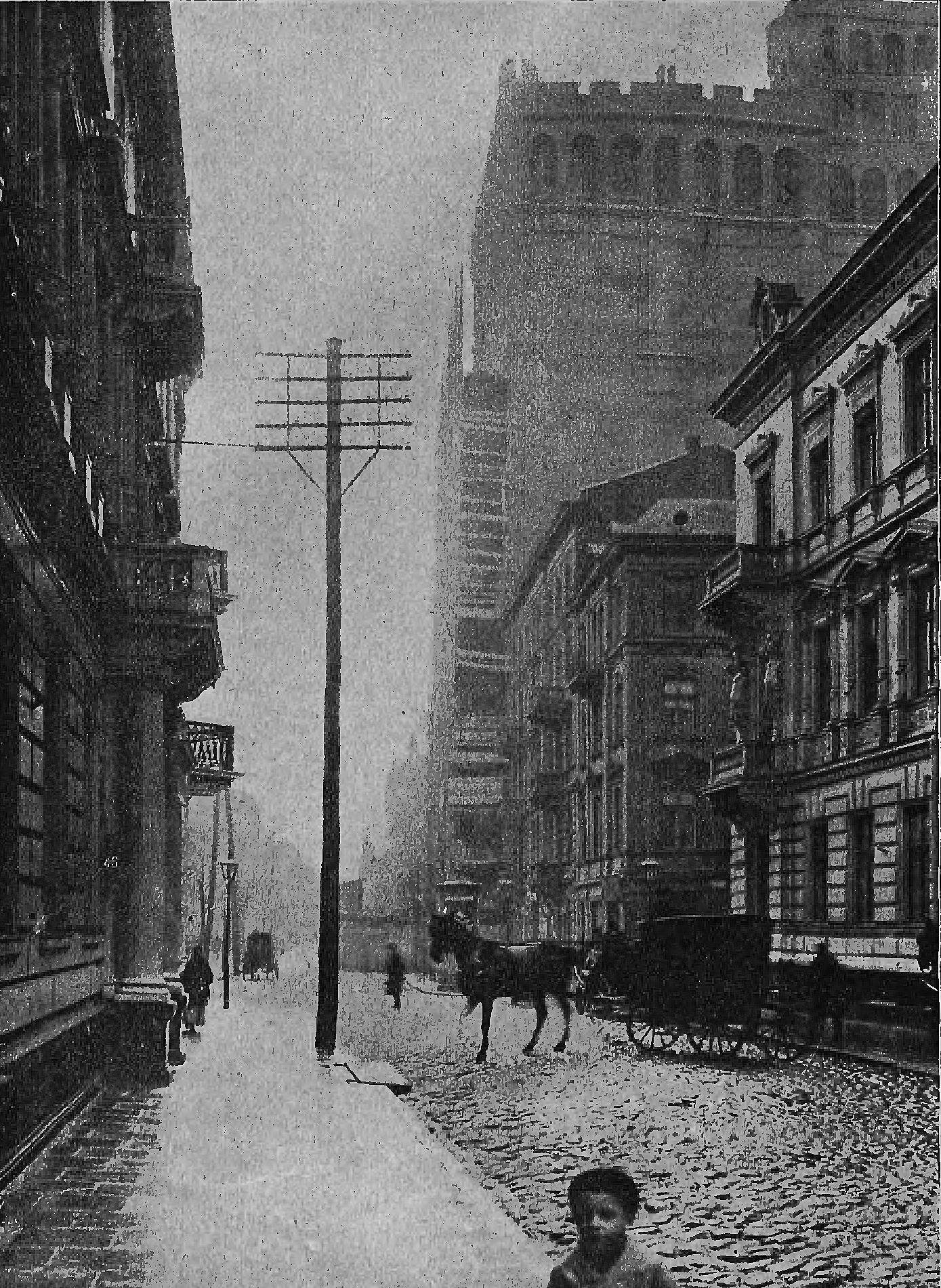
Cedergren skyscraper in Warsaw, 1910

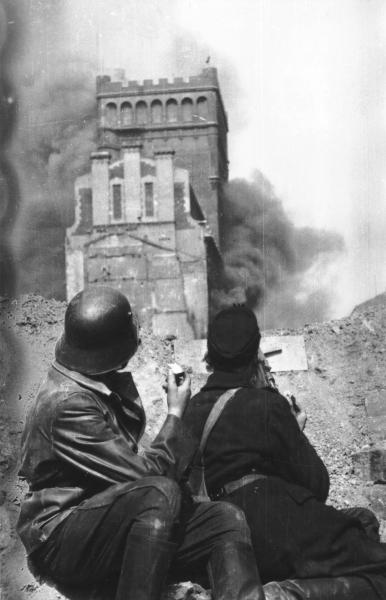
The PAST building burning during the Warsaw Uprising

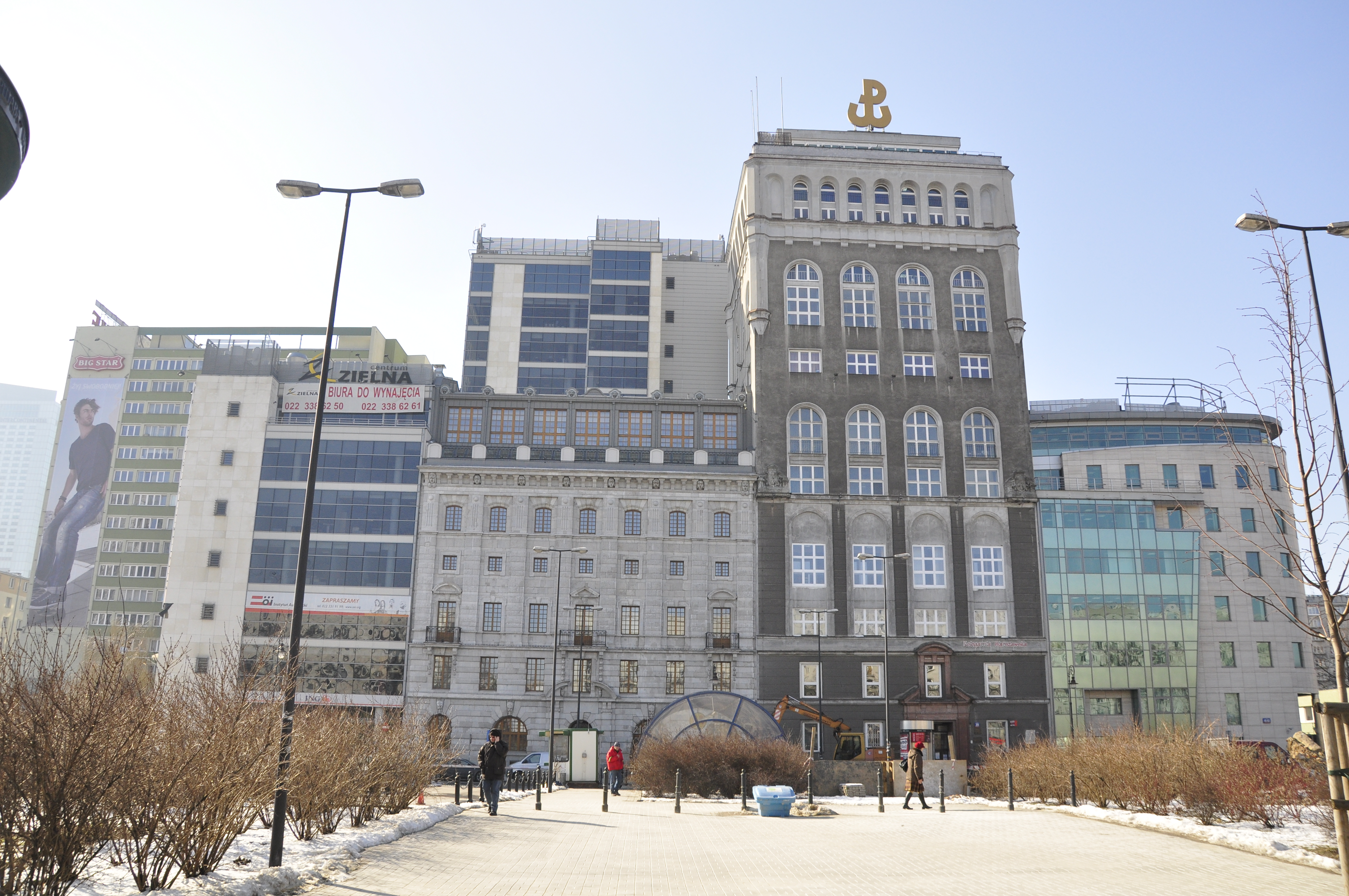
Present-day view of the company's former headquarters

== See also ==
- Prudential, Warsaw
- List of tallest buildings in Poland
