= Polska Poczta, Telegraf i Telefon =

Polish Post, Telegraph and Telephone
- Polska Poczta, Telegraf i Telefon
- Heaquarters in Warsaw, 1934

Agency overview
- Formed: 22 March 1928
- Dissolved: 4 December 1991
- Superseding agencies: Polish Post; Telekomunikacja Polska
- Headquarters: Warsaw
- Parent agency: Ministry of Post and Telegraphs

Polska Poczta, Telegraf i Telefon (Polish Post, Telegraph and Telephone) (known in its acyronym PPTiT) was the Polish state-owned Postal, telegraph and telephone service operating in the years 1928–1991, being a monopoloy in the fields of postal services and telecommunications. In 1987 it was transformed into a state organizational unit. During the existence of the Second Polish Republic it was subordinated to the Ministry of Post and Telegraphs.

== History ==
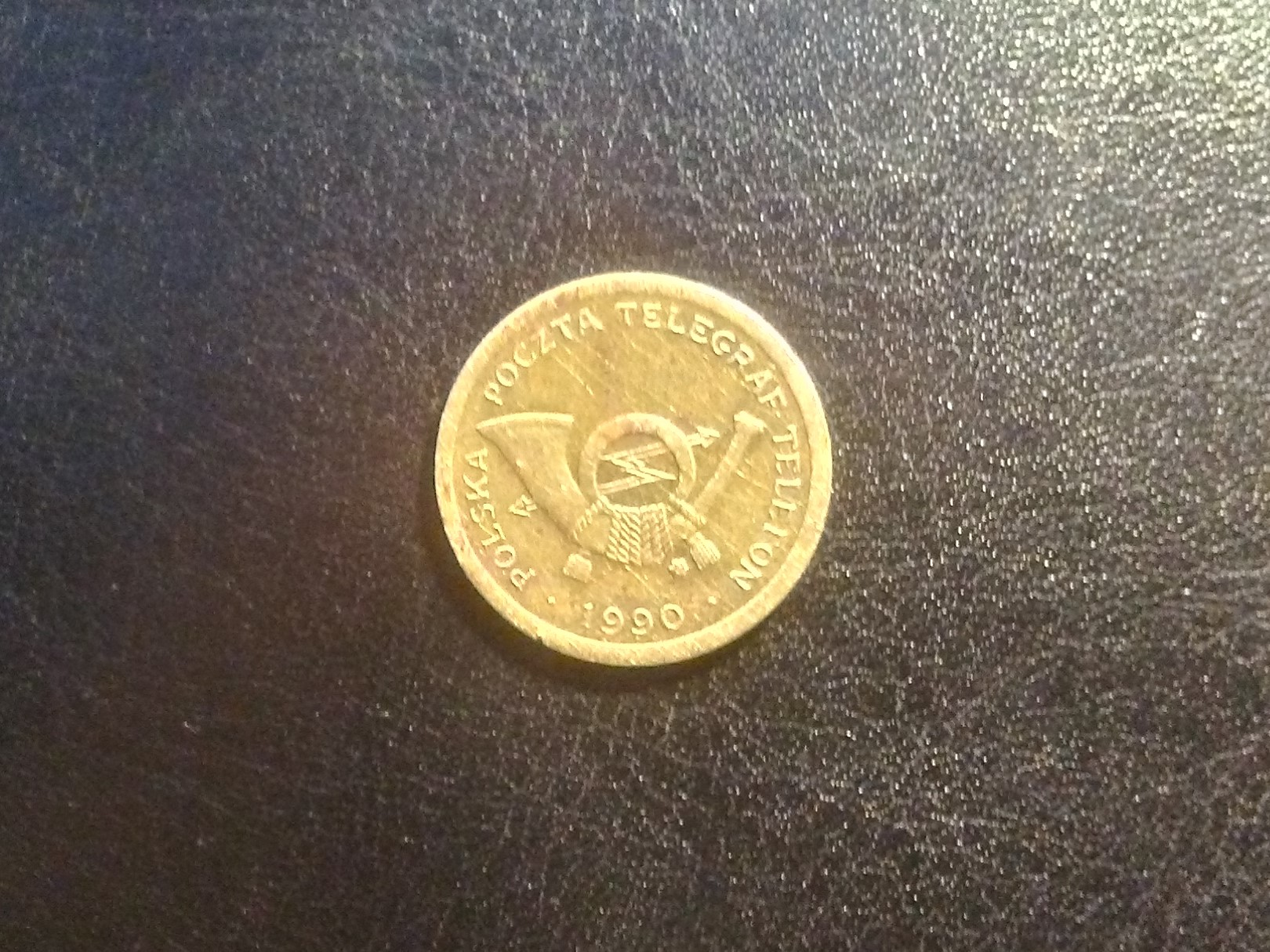
Telephone token issued by PPTiT

In March 1927, at the initiative of the minister of industry and trade, Eugeniusz Kwiatkowski, a regulation was issued on the commercialization of state-owned enterprises. It allowed for the creation of state-owned enterprises with legal personality and the transformation of existing enterprises in this direction. This resulted in their separation from the structures of state administration and adaptation to operate in commercial conditions.

The potential transformation of the post office and telegraph into a commercial enterprise created new opportunities for the development of this branch of the economy. For the Polish authorities, the best example of this were the reforms of the French post office (from 1923) and the German post office (from 1924). The new solutions that were applied there, such as: gaining financial independence, defining responsibility for the enterprise, limiting parliamentary intervention in postal matters, introducing a new management system and motivation for staff, as well as the freedom and speed of decisions made by the management in conditions of changing economic conditions, allowed for the rapid development of the postal network and an increase in the income of postal enterprises in these countries. Operating in commercial conditions also forced the introduction of new, previously unknown postal and telecommunications services.

The idea of commercializing enterprises in Poland proved effective in the example of the Polish State Railways. This largest pre-war enterprise in the country had been operating on commercial principles since 1926. Rationalization of the administration and operation of the enterprise brought the expected results, which led to acceleration of work on reforming the post office.

The legal basis for the establishment of the postal and telecommunications enterprise was the regulation of the President of the Republic of Poland from 1928 on the establishment of the state enterprise "Polska Poczta, Telegraf i Telefon". According to its provisions, the date of commencement of operations was to be determined by the minister of posts and telegraphs together with the minister of the treasury. Another regulation specified 1 July 1928 as the date of commencement of PPTiT operations and its takeover of the movable and immovable assets previously owned by the State Treasury.

Following the war, massive reconstruction efforts needed due to the enormous damage. The first serious attempt to organize postal and telecommunications regulations can be considered the decree on communications of March 11, 1955. Through it, the Council of Ministers had the right to suspend or limit communications traffic in all or part of the country.

== Operations ==
The enterprise was to be managed according to commercial principles, taking into account the needs of the state and the interests of society. Its task was to operate all postal, telegraph and telecommunications equipment in the country. It was responsible for the obligations of the State Treasury in the field of post and telegraph. PPTiT had legal personality. The management of the state enterprise "Polska Poczta, Telegraf i Telefon" was exercised by the minister of posts and telegraphs with the help of local Directorates of Posts and Telegraphs and their subordinate structures. The enterprise was exempt from taxes and public levies in favor of the State Treasury and local government. It also had some freedom in managing finances and real estate, but numerous restrictions in these matters often prevented faster development.

Despite the beginning of the reform in 1928, the process of full commercialization of the enterprise was delayed. It was not possible to introduce important bodies that would guarantee a large independence of the enterprise, such as the administrative council or the supervisory board. The assets that PPTiT had were transferred not to ownership but to management, which significantly hindered investment and operational activities.

On January 1, 1930, Minister Ignacy Boerner, striving to complete the commercialization of the post office, established the Office of Studies – a body that was to deal with further commercialization and modernization of the enterprise. The result of the Office's work was an amendment to the regulation establishing the enterprise "Polska Poczta, Telegraf i Telefon". In accordance with the regulation of 1932, the enterprise was defined as an institution of public law. Property matters were regulated anew, real estate was transferred to "trust management and use", while all movable property was transferred to the enterprise as ownership. An inventory and valuation of assets was also announced, which was necessary to prepare the opening balance, which in turn was a necessary condition for the actual commercialization of the enterprise.

Despite the expansion of the independence of the "Polska Poczta, Telegraf i Telefon" enterprise, it still did not gain full independence, especially in terms of credit. Commercialization was also not completed due to the lack of the enterprise's opening balance.

Ultimately, as a result of several months of work, it was possible to establish the opening balance of the enterprise as of April 1, 1937, which was then approved by the resolution of the Council of Ministers of November 24, 1937. In this way, on April 1, 1937, the long process of commercialization and formation of the enterprise was completed.

In 1939, there were 1,274 post offices, telecommunications and telegraph-telephone offices and 2,911 postal agencies operating on Poland.

On December 4, 1991, by order of the Minister of Communications, in place of the state organizational unit "Polska Poczta, Telegraf i Telefon" two separate economic entities were established: the state-owned public utility company "Poczta Polska" and the joint-stock company of the State Treasury "Telekomunikacja Polska".

== See also ==
- Polish Telephone Joint-Stock Company
