= Zielna Street, Warsaw =

Street in Warsaw, Poland

Coordinates: 52°14′12″N 21°00′23″E

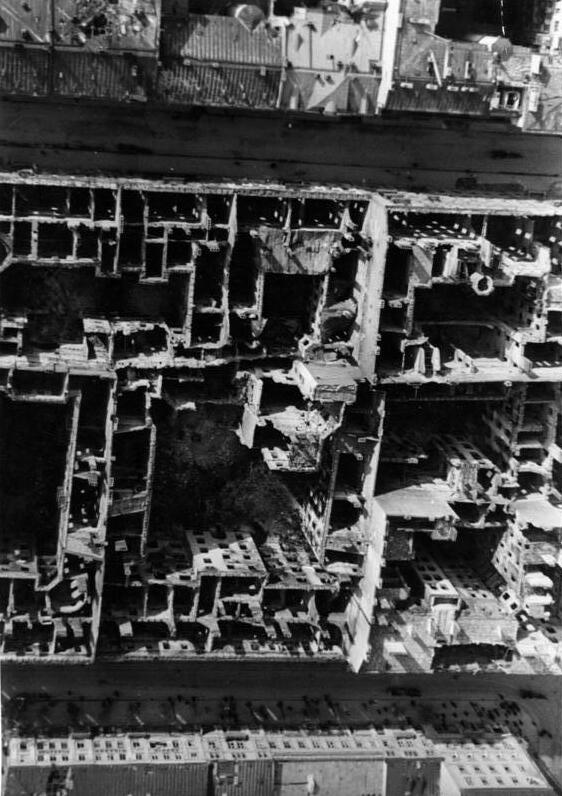
Warsaw during World War II: destroyed townhouses between Zielna (top) and Marszałkowska streets (bottom). In bottom right corner building Marszałkowska 156 on the corner with Królewskia street, also visible Bloch Palace at Marszałkowska 154. September 1939

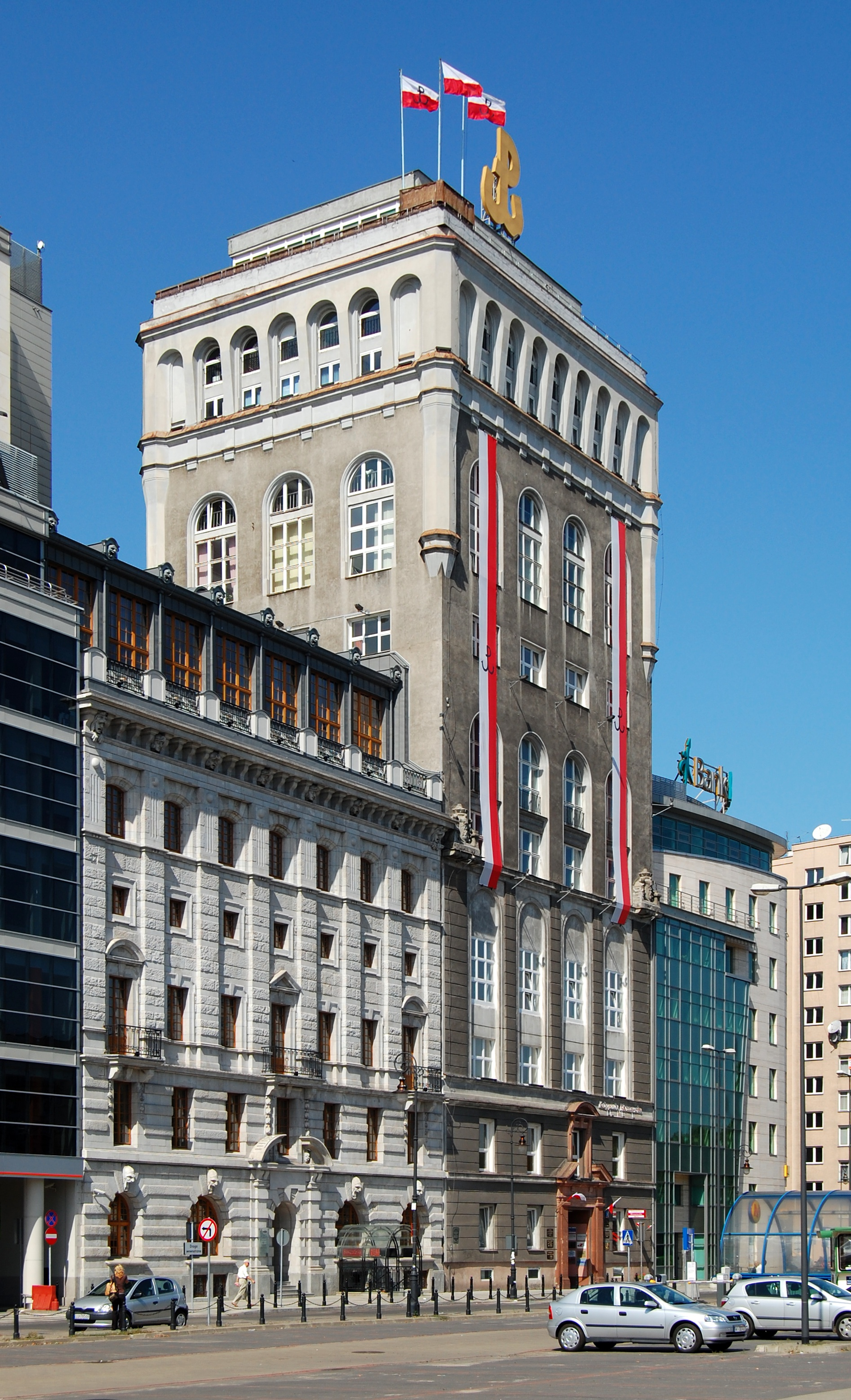
PAST Building in Warsaw

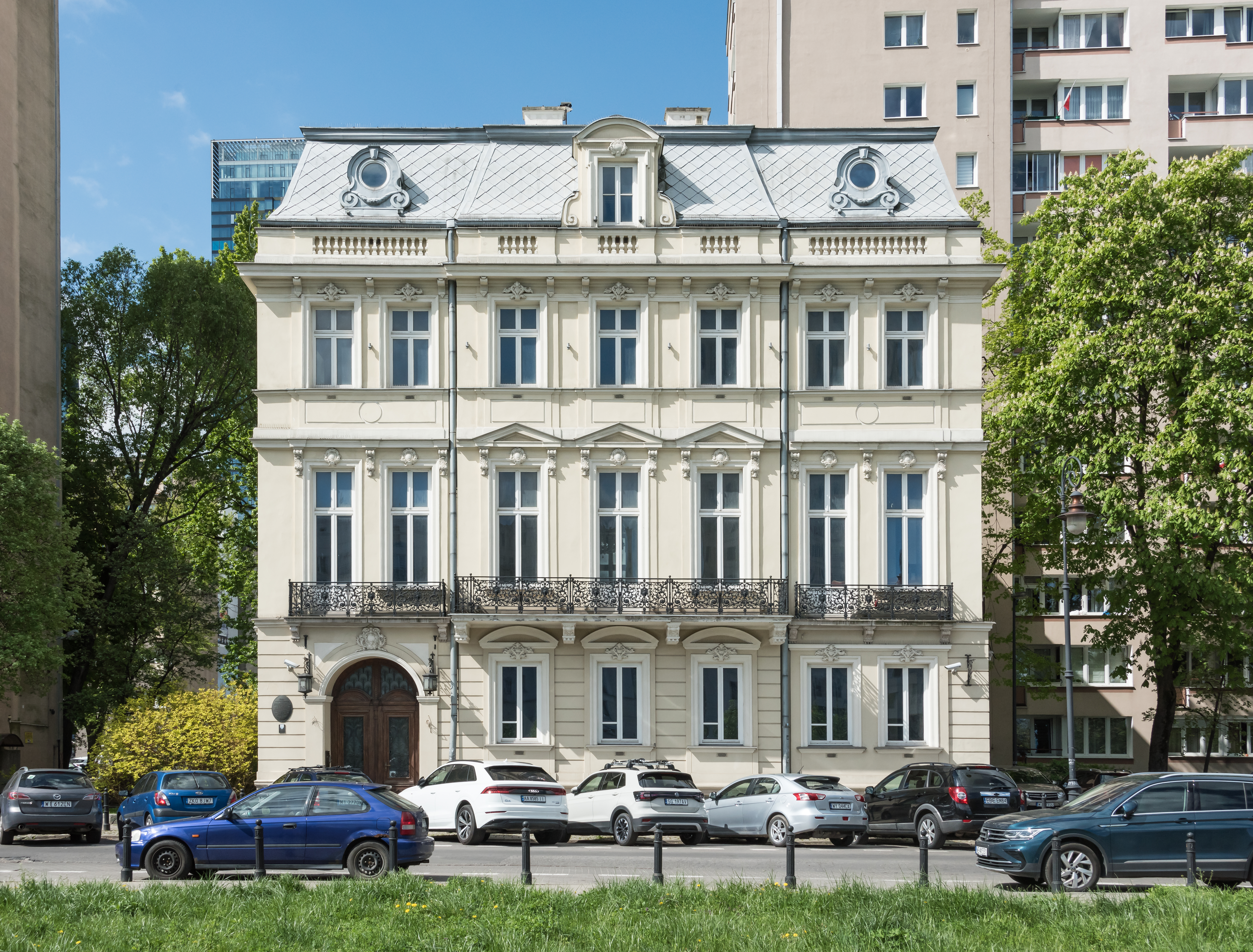
Janiszów Palace on Zielna Street in Warsaw

Zielna (literally "related to weeds or herbs", "herbal") is a street in Warsaw city centre, Poland. Initially one of the main streets linking the southern city centre with its northern part, it lost much of its significance in 1941, when the nearby Marszałkowska street had been extended across the Saxon Garden to the Bankowy Sq. During the Warsaw Uprising of 1944 heavy fighting took place for the PAST skyscraper located at Zielna 37. The building was taken by the Polish forces in the effect of heavy fights. After the Uprising most of the street had been completely demolished. After the war only the two buildings of the PAST company had been rebuilt, while the rest of the ruins were removed. Currently there are plans to fill the empty space between Zielna and Marszałkowska with new houses, which however is still disputed.
