= Confederation Square (Warsaw) =

Urban square in Warsaw, Poland

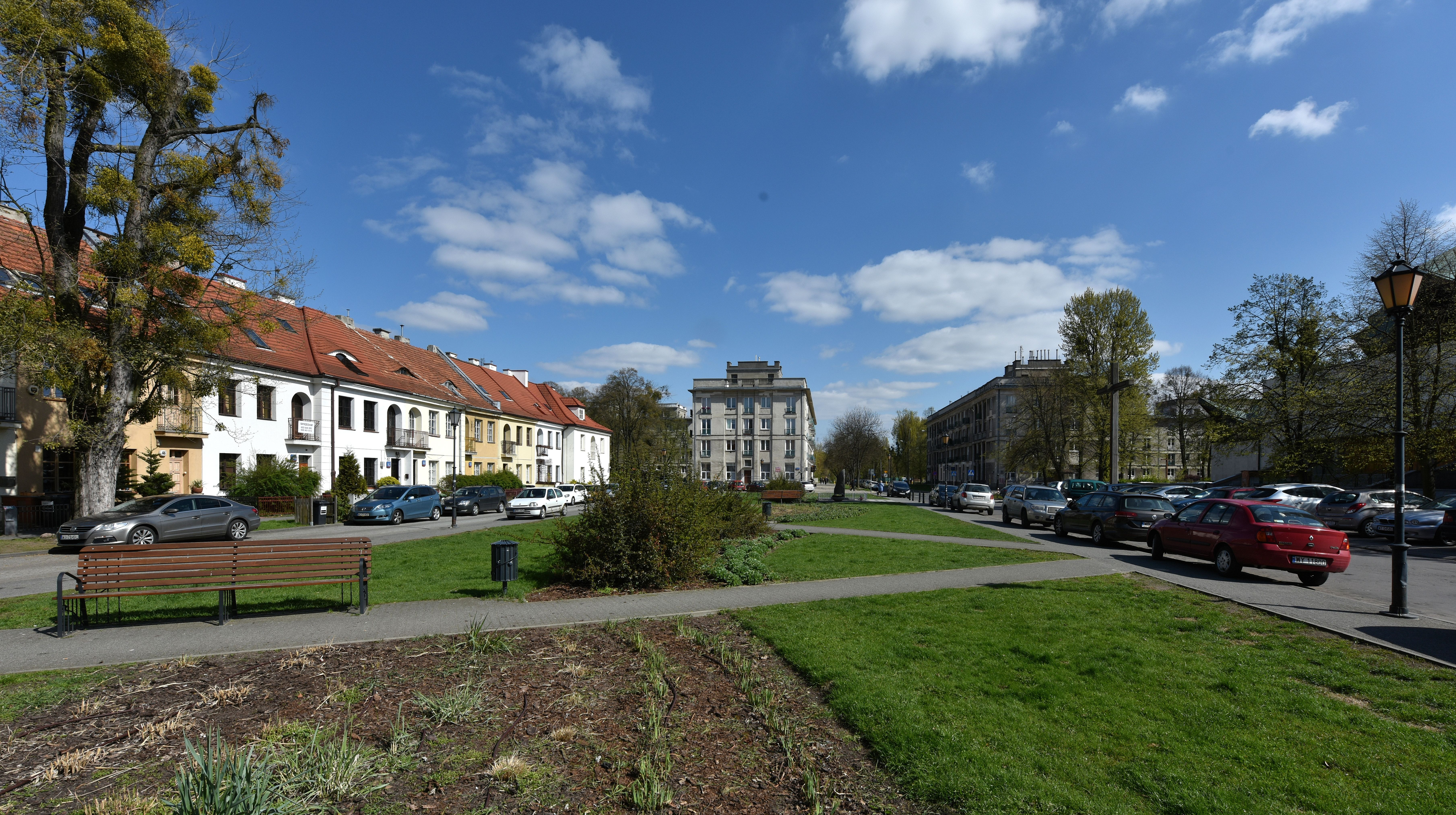
- Confederation Square in 2017

- Location within Warsaw
- Location: Warsaw, Poland
- Coordinates: 52°16′47.2″N 20°56′47.7″E
- North: Lipińska Street; Płatnicza Street
- East: Schroegera Street
- South: Daniłowskiego Street; Płatnicza Street
- West: Schroegera Street

Construction
- Completed: 1920s

Confederation Square (Polish: Plac Konfederacji) is an urban square in Warsaw, Poland. It is located in the district of Bielany, at the crossing of Płatnicza Street, Lipińska Street, Schroegera Street, and Daniłowskiego Street. The square was built in the late 1920s.

== Name ==
The park was named after confederations, which were special associations formed by nobility in the Polish–Lithuanian Commonwealth. The most famous of those were the Bar Confederation formed in 1768, and the Targowica Confederation in 1792.

== History ==
The square was constructed in the late 1920s, beginning in 1926. It was built as a part of the then-developed suburban neighbourhood of Zdobycz Robotnicza in Warsaw. Around it were built 27 detached houses, which were designed by Janusz Dzierżawski in the manor house style.

Between 1953 and 1954, next to the square, several terraced houses, designed by Maria Piechotek and Kazimierz Piechotek, were built.

In 1981, next to the square, the Church of St. Sigismund, designed by Zbigniew Pawelski, was built.

== Characteristics ==
Confederation Square is a small rectangular urban square, located at the crossing of Płatnicza Street, Lipińska Street, Schroegera Street, and Daniłowskiego Streets. It has the area 0.70 ha.

In its centre, there is a monument dedicated to the 77th Infantry Regiment of the Polish Armed Forces, and the 77th Infantry Regiment of the Home Army, both of which served during the Second World War. It is shaped like a rock with an institution sculpted on it.

== Gallery ==
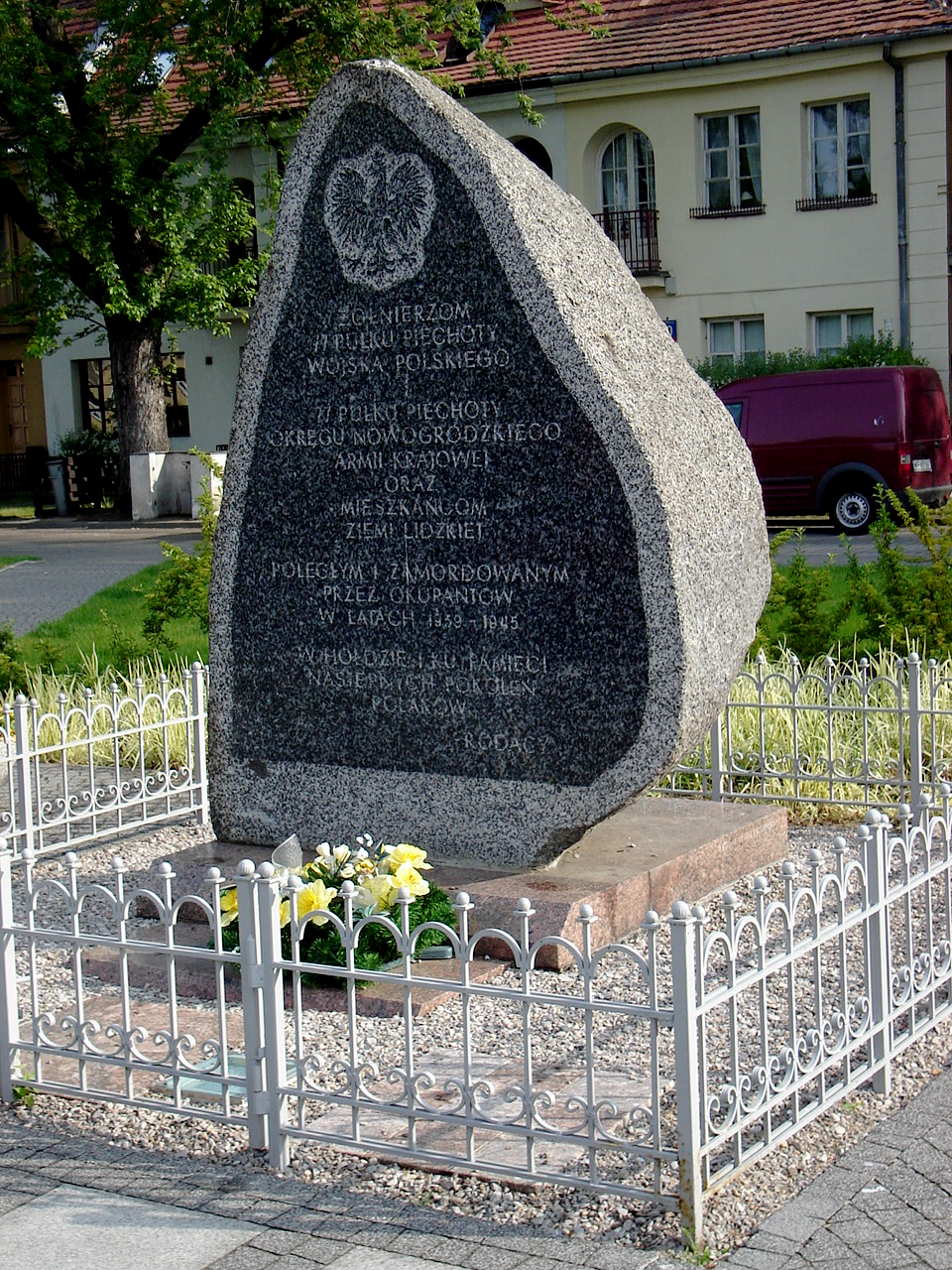
The monument dedicated to the 77th Infantry Regiment of the Polish Armed Forces, and the 77th Infantry Regiment of the Home Army.
