= Cedergren =

Telecommunications company

- Industry: Telecommunications
- Founded: 1900
- Founder: Henrik Tore Cedergren
- Defunct: 1922
- Successor: PAST
- Area served: Warsaw

Cedergren was a Swedish telecommunications company running the telephone network in Warsaw between 1900 and the interbellum. Named after its founder, Henrik Tore Cedergren, it was notable as the first official phone operator in that city and the company to finance the Cedergren building, the first skyscraper in the then Imperial Russia. Its assets in Poland were taken by its successor, the PAST company, when the license expired in 1922. The Swedish branch of the firm was bought by Allmänna Telefon AB LM Ericsson, the predecessor of modern Ericsson company.
