= Ministry of Post and Telegraphs (Poland) =

Polish ministry

- Ministerstwo Poczt i Telegrafów
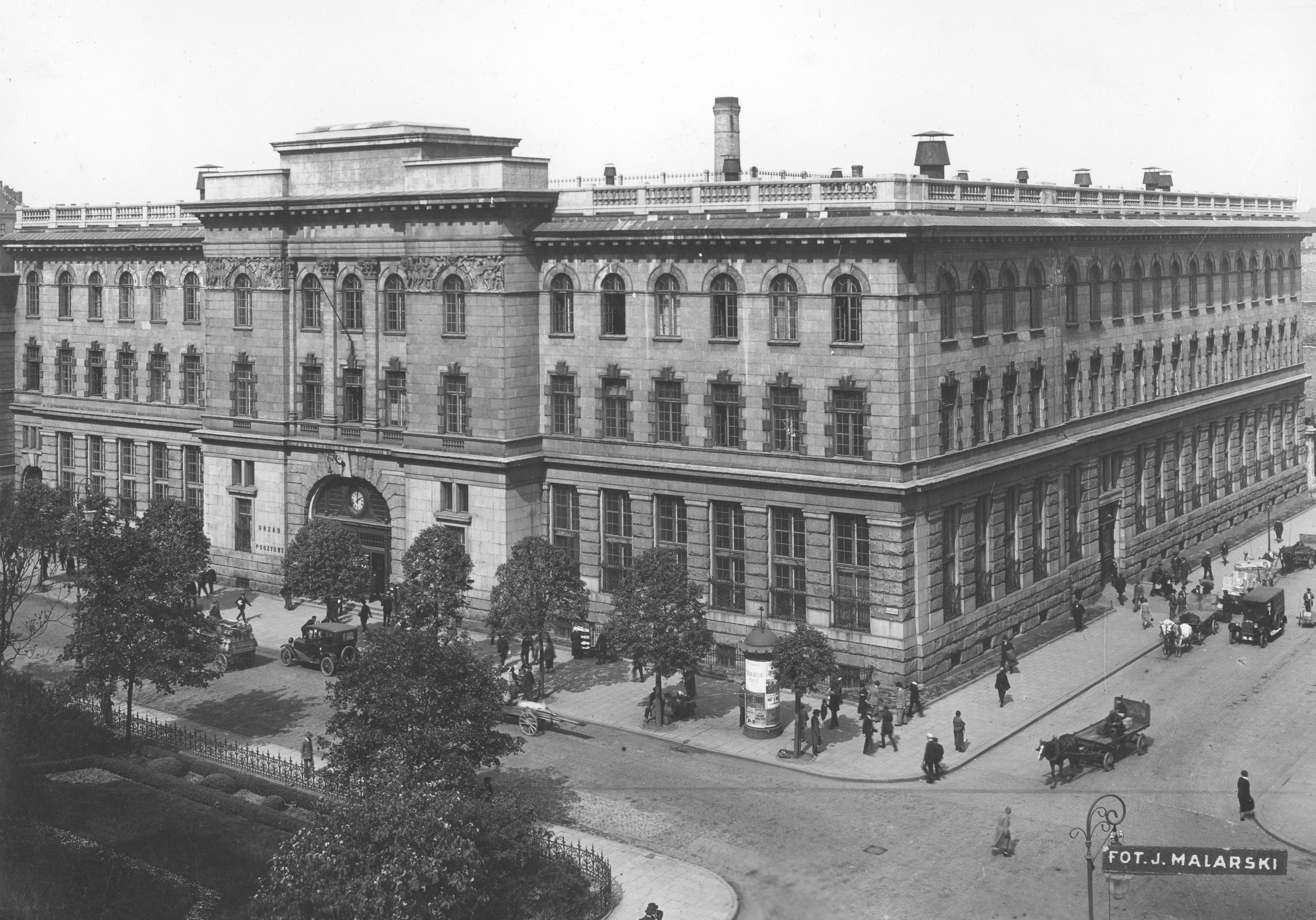
- The Main Post Office building at Napoleon Square, the seat of the Ministry until 1939

Agency overview
- Formed: 1919-1924; 1927-1939
- Headquarters: Warsaw
- Parent agency: Council of Ministers
- Child agency: Polska Poczta, Telegraf i Telefon

Ministry of Post and Telegraphs (Polish: Ministerstwo Poczt i Telegrafów, MPiT) was a ministry in the Second Polish Republic. It existed in 1919–1924 and 1927–1939, when it was dissolved because of the Invasion of Poland. In July 1944, the MPiT was recreated by the Polish Committee of National Liberation, under the name Ministry of Communications, Post and Telegraphs, and in November 1944, its pre-war name was reintroduced. On March 11, 1955, the MPiT was renamed into Ministry of Communications.

The Ministry of Post and Telegraphs was created on February 5, 1919, by a decree of Chief of State Jozef Pilsudski. Its first chairman was Tomasz Arciszewski, who had been tasked to create the ministry on November 18, 1918. In its first years of existence, the MPiT faced several problems. The newly created Polish state (see Partitions of Poland) lacked qualified cadres, there was no equipment, also postal regulations in the three former empires differed from each other.

In late 1918, the MPiT controlled only parts of former Congress Poland, but as a result of several armed conflicts, most of which were won by the Polish Army (see Polish–Soviet War), it expanded. By 1922, the MPiT took over postal administration of former Republic of Central Lithuania, and Polish Upper Silesia. Also, in 1919–1920, postal services of former Province of Posen and Pomerelia were subjected to Ministry of Former Prussian District (Ministerstwo bylej Dzielnicy Pruskiej). In the autumn of 1938, the MPiT expanded to Trans-Olza, while the Free City of Danzig had its own post (see Postage stamps and postal history of Free City of Danzig).

In 1920, the Technical Council of the MPiT was opened, and on April 1, 1921, Organizational Statutes of the Ministry of Post and Telegraphs were declared, in which four departments of the MPiT were created (administrative, postal, telephones and telegraphs, economical and a separate accounting office).

On December 5, 1923, the government of Poland dissolved the MPiT for financial reasons. All postal, telegraph and telephone issues were subjected to Ministry of Industry and Commerce, which controlled General Office of Posts and Telegraphs. This decision had a negative influence on quality of postal services of the country, and three years later, on January 19, 1927, Prime Minister Józef Piłsudski reopened the MPiT. Pilsudski was well aware of the importance of communications for national defence. On March 1, 1927, the MPiT was divided into three departments: general, postal and technical. In October 1928, the separate military office was added.

In 1933, organizational structure of the MPiT was changed for the last time before the war. From then on, until September 1939, it was divided into the following departments:

- the Office of the Minister,
- Personnel Office,
- Military Office,
- Administrative Department,
- Postal Department,
- Technical Department.

The Ministry of Post and Telegraphs divided Poland into nine Regional Offices of Post and Telegraph (Dyrekcje Okregu Poczt i Telegrafu):

- 1st Office of Post and Telegraph (1. Okreg PiT), Warsaw. In 1938 it was managed by Karol Zuchowicz,
- 2nd Office of Post and Telegraph (2. Okreg PiT), Lublin. Managed by Waclaw Swietochlowski,
- 3rd Office of Post and Telegraph (3. Okreg PiT), Wilno. Managed by Mieczyslaw Nowicki,
- 4th Office of Post and Telegraph (4. Okreg PiT), Katowice. Managed by Stefan Franciszek Popiel,
- 5th Office of Post and Telegraph (5. Okreg PiT), Kraków. Managed by Alfred Spett,
- 6th Office of Post and Telegraph (6. Okreg PiT), Lwow. Managed by Dominik Moszoro,
- 7th Office of Post and Telegraph (7. Okreg PiT), Poznań. Managed by Alfred Maksymilian Karol Wallner,
- 8th Office of Post and Telegraph (8. Okreg PiT), Bydgoszcz. Managed by Wlodzimierz Kozubek,

There also was 9th Office of Post and Telegraph (9. Okreg PiT) in the Free City of Danzig. Managed by Eryk Budzynski.

Apart from its regional offices, the Ministry managed other bodies, such as State Telecommunications Institute, Museum of Post and Telegraphs, and Main Depot of Post Equipment.

In the first days of the 1939 Invasion of Poland, the Ministry was tasked with providing communication between central government offices in Warsaw, and regional administration of Poland. Together with the government, the Ministry was first evacuated to Lublin, then to Lutsk, Dubno and Rowne. On September 15, 1939, the Ministry was located in Kossow, and two days later, following the Soviet invasion of Poland, its staff, together with minister Emil Kaminski, crossed the Romanian border at Kuty.

== See also ==
- Postage stamps and postal history of Poland
- Poczta Polska
- Polska Poczta, Telegraf i Telefon
