= Fort Bema =

Neighbourhood in Warsaw, Poland

- City Information System area (neighbourhood)
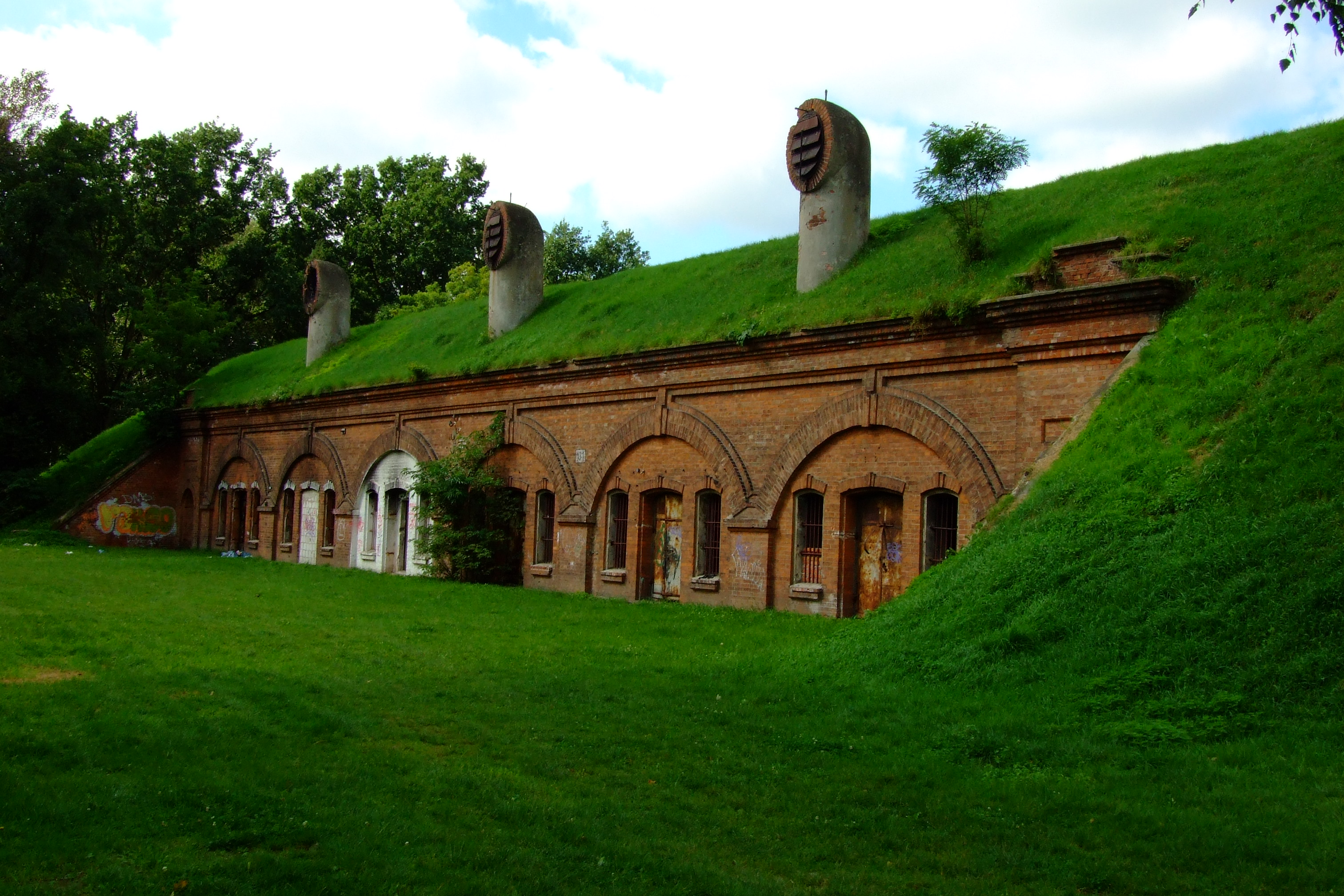
- Bem Fort, a part of Warsaw's fortifications, dating to 1890.

- Location of the Fort Bema neighbourhood within Bemowo district
- Coordinates: 52.262027°N 20.937281°E
- Country: Poland
- Voivodeship: Masovian
- City and county: Warsaw
- District: Bemowo
- Incorporation into Warsaw: 14 May 1951
- Time zone: UTC+1 (CET)
  - Summer (DST): UTC+2 (CEST)
- Area code: +48 22

Fort Bema (Polish: [ˈfɔrt ˈbɛ.ma]; lit. 'Bem's Fort') is a neighbourhood and City Information System area in the Bemowo district of Warsaw, Poland. It is a residential neighbourhood with mid- and high-rise multifamily housing, and is centred around the Bem Fort, historical 19th-century fortifications whose surroundings now form a park.

By the 16th century, the village of Parysów was located in the area. In 1890, Fort P was built there as part of the city's fortifications, which were later decommissioned in 1909. From the 1950s to 1970s, it was a supply base for the nearby Warsaw Babice Airport. In the first quarter of the 21st century, multifamily housing estates were developed around it.

== Toponomy ==
The neighbourhood is named after Bem Fort (Polish: Fort Bema), historical 19th-century fortifications located at its centre. The building itself was called as such in 1921 in honour of Józef Bem, an 18th- and 19th-century engineer and military officer, and veteran of the November Uprising.

== History ==
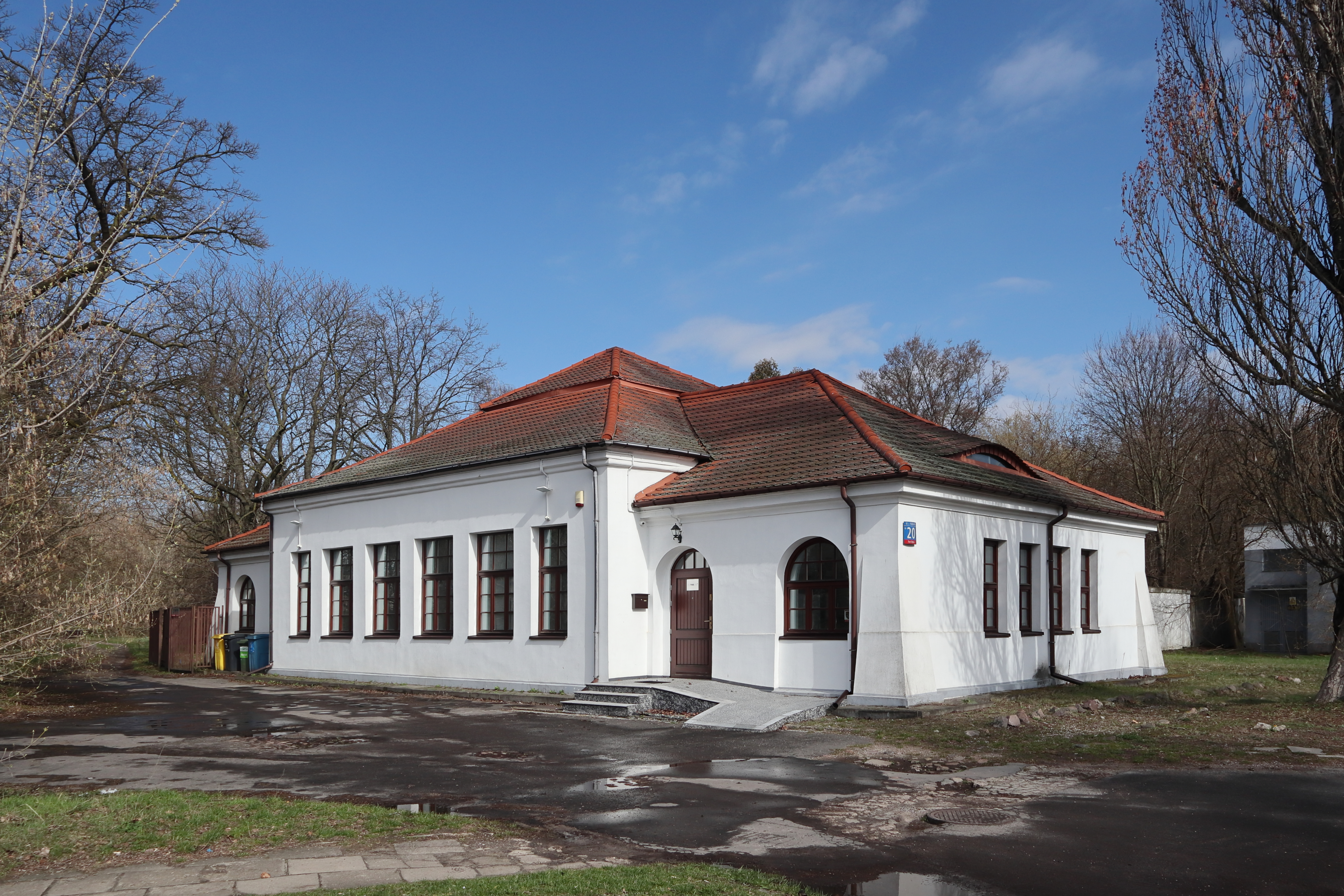
One of the historic villas in Parysów, dating to the 1920s

By the 16th century, a farming community was present in the area, owned by the goldsmith Fołtan. It was later named Parysów, after the Parys family, which acquired it in 1573. Next, it was owned by city councillor Kasper Walter from 1666, and architects A. Solary and J. Fontanna in the first half of the 18th century. The village was located near the current corner of Maczka and Obrońców Tobruku Streets, while its farmlands stretched between Bonifraterska Street, Miła Street, Muranowska Street, and the village of Wielka Wola. In the 17th century, there was also a brick factory.

Between 1886 and 1890, Fort P was constructed to the south of the village of Parysów. It was part of the series of fortifications of the Warsaw Fortress, built around the city by the Imperial Russian Army. The fort was decommissioned and partially demolished in 1909. In 1921, it was renamed in honour of Józef Bem, an 18th- and 19th-century engineer and military officer, and veteran of the November Uprising. From 1924 to 1939, it housed an ammunition factory.

In 1920, a wooden building at 90 Powązkowska Street was adapted into the St. Josaphat Catholic Church. According to some theories, the structure could have been the St. Nicholas the Wonderworker Eastern Orthodox Church, dating to 1872, however, others suspect it had been demolished by then. In 1966, it was replaced with a new, larger brick building. Throughout the 1920s, several villas were built in the area of Waldorffa Street near the fort. In the 1970s, they were acquired by the military.

In September 1939, during the siege of Warsaw, the fort was defended by the 202nd Company of the 4th Battalion of the 30th Kaniów Riflemen Regiment of the Polish Armed Forces, led by major Ludwik Łukasiewicz. On 9 September, it was replaced by the 1st Battalion of the 144th Infantry Regiment, commanded by major Bronisław Wadas. Despite numerous German attacks, it remained under Polish control until the capitulation of Warsaw on 28 September 1939. While under the German occupation until 1944, it was used as a weapons warehouse. Around it were built several brick outpost bunkers, which during the course of the conflict were attacked numerous times by the Polish resistance. After the end of the war, it functioned as a prisoner-of-war camp for German soldiers.

From 1950 to 1978, it was used as a supply base for the nearby Warsaw Babice Airport. In the 1950s, an air traffic control tower was built to its east, at the current corner of Wiadowska and Osmańczyka Streets. It was abandoned in the 1970s, and since 2017, is listed on the municipal heritage list. The airport was scaled down at the end of the 1980s, with its eastern runway being demolished. In the 1990s, Powstańców Śląskich Street was built in its place.

On 14 May 1951, the area was incorporated into the city of Warsaw, becoming part of the Wola district. On 29 December 1989, following an administrative reform in the city, it became part of the municipality of Warsaw-Wola, and on 25 March 1994, of the municipality of Warsaw-Bemowo, which on 27 October 2002 was restructured into the city district of Bemowo. In 1997, Bemowo was subdivided into ten City Information System areas, with Fort Bema becoming one of them.

In 1953, the Air Force Institute of Technology, a government research institution of aviation technologies, was founded, with the majority of its laboratories now located within the neighbourhood, in the complex centred around 6 Księcia Bolesława Street. It inherited the structures of the former institutions operating in Warsaw before the Second World War, which conducted their research at an aerodrome, now located at the Warsaw Babice Airport. This included the Aviation Institute of Technology, which together with its predecessors had its beginnings in 1918.

From the 1980s, Bem Fort was owned by the Legia Warsaw sports club, which built several of its facilities around it. In 1999, the fort was acquired by the city. Its surroundings were sold for the development of high-rise housing estates and apartment buildings. Beginning in 2002, its central area was redeveloped into a park.

In the 1990s, an abandoned airport hangar at 40 Obrońców Tobruku Street was adapted into Hala OSiR Bemowo arena, hosting the Legia Warsaw basketball team. In 1999, the Galeria Bemowo shopping mall was opened at 126 Powstańców Śląskich Street. Plans to demolish it and replace it with a housing estate were announced in 2025.

In 2014, the St. John Paul II Parish of the Catholic Church was established, residing in a provisional chapel at 48 Obrońców Tobruku Street, with plans for the construction of a permanent church in the future. In 2015, a tram line was built along Powstańców Śląskich Street, forming a connection between the Bemowo and Bielany districts.

== Characteristics ==
The neighbourhood is centred around the Bem Fort, historical decommissioned fortifications dating to 1890, whose immediate surroundings now form a park. It is encircled by several housing estates. Other historical buildings in the neighbourhood include an abandoned air traffic control tower, near the corner of Wiadowska and Osmańczyka Streets, listed on the municipal heritage list. The area also includes the historic neighbourhood of Parysów, with several villas from the 1920s at Waldorffa Street.

The amenities of the neighbourhood include Hala OSiR Bemowo arena, at 40 Obrońców Tobruku Street, which hosts the Legia Warsaw basketball team, and has a capacity of 1,416 spectators during matches and 2,300 during concerts. It also has the Galeria Bemowo shopping mall at 126 Powstańców Śląskich Street, with a tram line along the aforementioned road.

Fort Bema also features two Catholic churches, St. Josaphat Church at 90 Powązkowska Street and St. John Paul II Parish Chapel at 48 Obrońców Tobruku Street.

Additionally, it includes an Air Force Institute of Technology laboratory complex, a government research institution of aviation technology, centred around 6 Księcia Bolesława Street.

== Boundaries ==
Fort Bema is a City Information System area, located in the northeast portion of the district of Bemowo. Its boundaries are approximately determined by Maczka Street, and Powązkowska Street to the north; and Obrońców Grodna Avenue to the east; the eastern boundary of the housing estate of Bemowo V to the southwest; and Powstańców Śląskich Street to the west.

The neighbourhood borders Chomiczówka to the northwest, Piaski to the north, Koło and Sady Żoliborskie to the east, Górce to the south, and Bemowo-Lotnisko and Lotnisko to the west. Its northern and eastern boundaries form part of the district's borders with Bielany and Żoliborz.
