= Piaski, Warsaw =

Piaski
- Neighbourhood and City Information System area
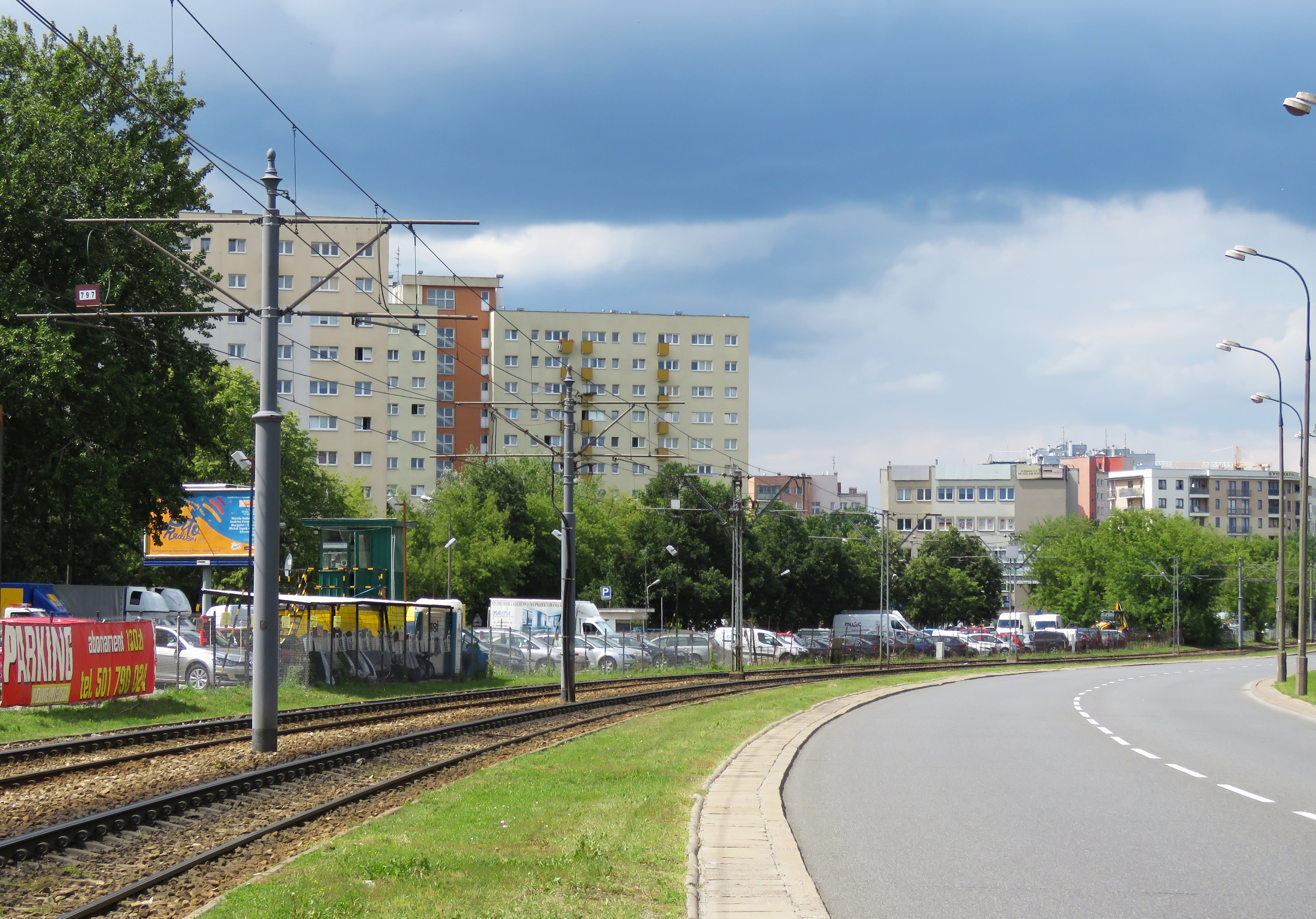
- Władysława Broniewskiego Street in Piaski, in 2017.

- Location of Piaski within the district of Bielany, in accordance to the City Information System.
- Coordinates: 52°16′06.77″N 20°56′36.77″E
- Country: Poland
- Voivodeship: Masovian
- City county: Warsaw
- District: Bielany
- Time zone: UTC+1 (CET)
  - Summer (DST): UTC+2 (CEST)
- Area code: +48 22

Piaski (Polish: [ˈpjas.ki]) is a neighbourhood, and an area of the City Information System, in the city of Warsaw, Poland, located within the district of Bielany.

== History ==
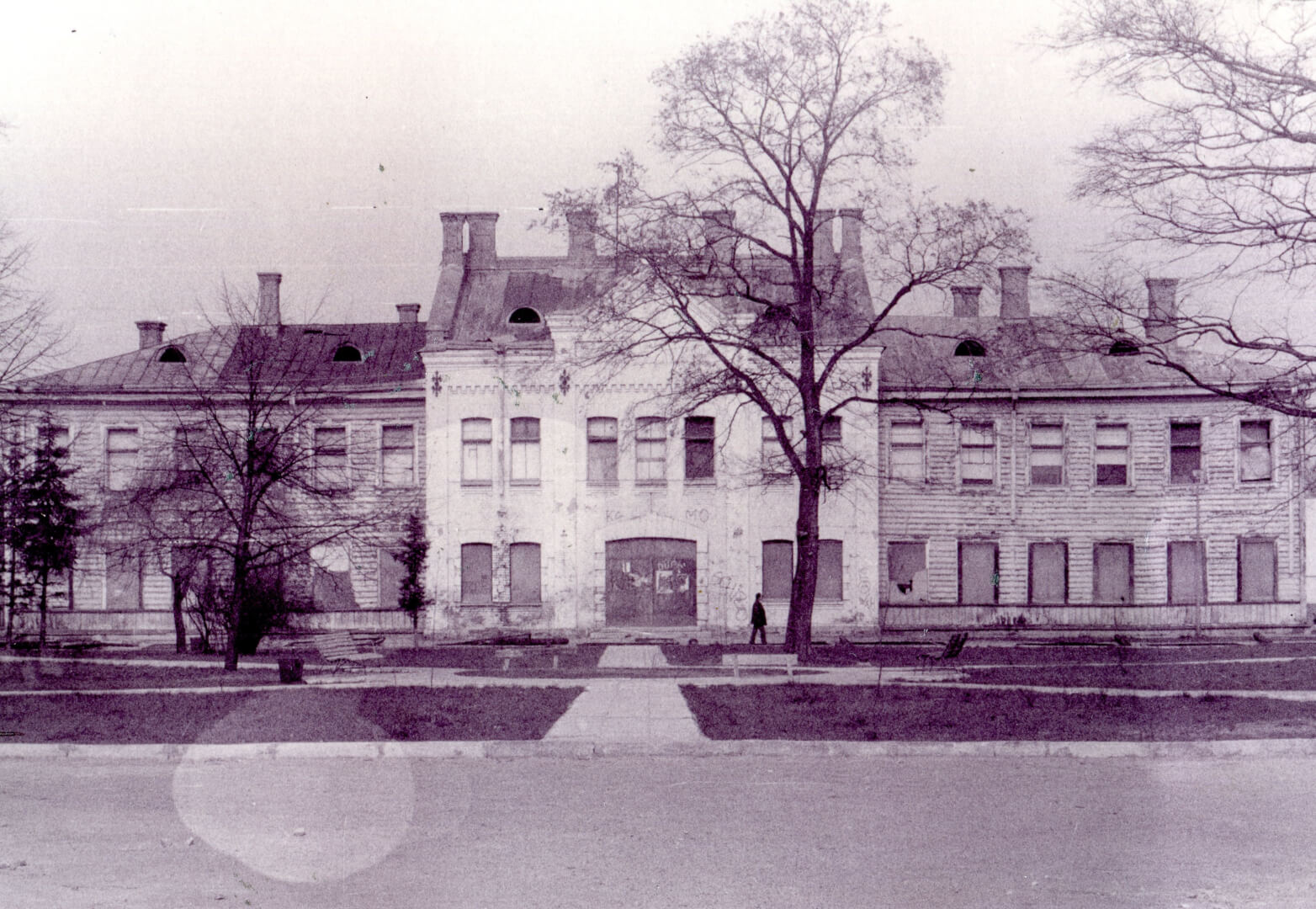
The building of the officer casino, which was one of the buildings of the barracks, build in Piaski in 1892.

The area of modern Piaski used to be covered by sandy dunes, and remained mostly underdeveloped until the 1970s.

The year 1888 marks the first known mention of the village of Młociny B (possibly an abbreviation to Młociny Burakowskie; literally: Młociny of Buraków), located within the modern area of Piaski. It was located near the village of Buraków. In 1892, the barracks of the Imperial Russian Army had been built in the area. The complex consisted of around 120 wooden and brick buildings. It also the included military training area.

On 8 April 1916, the area was incorporated into the city of Warsaw. After the year 1918, Młociny B had been renamed to Piaski. The name translates in Polish to sands and was a reference to the sandy dunes characteristic to the area.

Following the declaration of independence by the Second Polish Republic, the barracks and the surrounding military infrastructure began being used by the Polish Armed Forces. In the 1930s, in the area was also placed a railway training centre, to train railway workers. Some historians suspect, that the training centre was a cover for the secret operations of the Second Department of Polish General Staff, an intelligence agency of Polish Armed Forces.

During the Second World War, while under the German occupation, in the area was located the training centre of Abwehr, the military intelligence of Wehrmacht, and later also the military hospital, mainly for the soldiers injured at the Eastern Front. Following the end of the war, until October 1949, in the area was located Soviet prisoner-of-war camp. In 1949, it housed almost 300 prisoners-of-war.

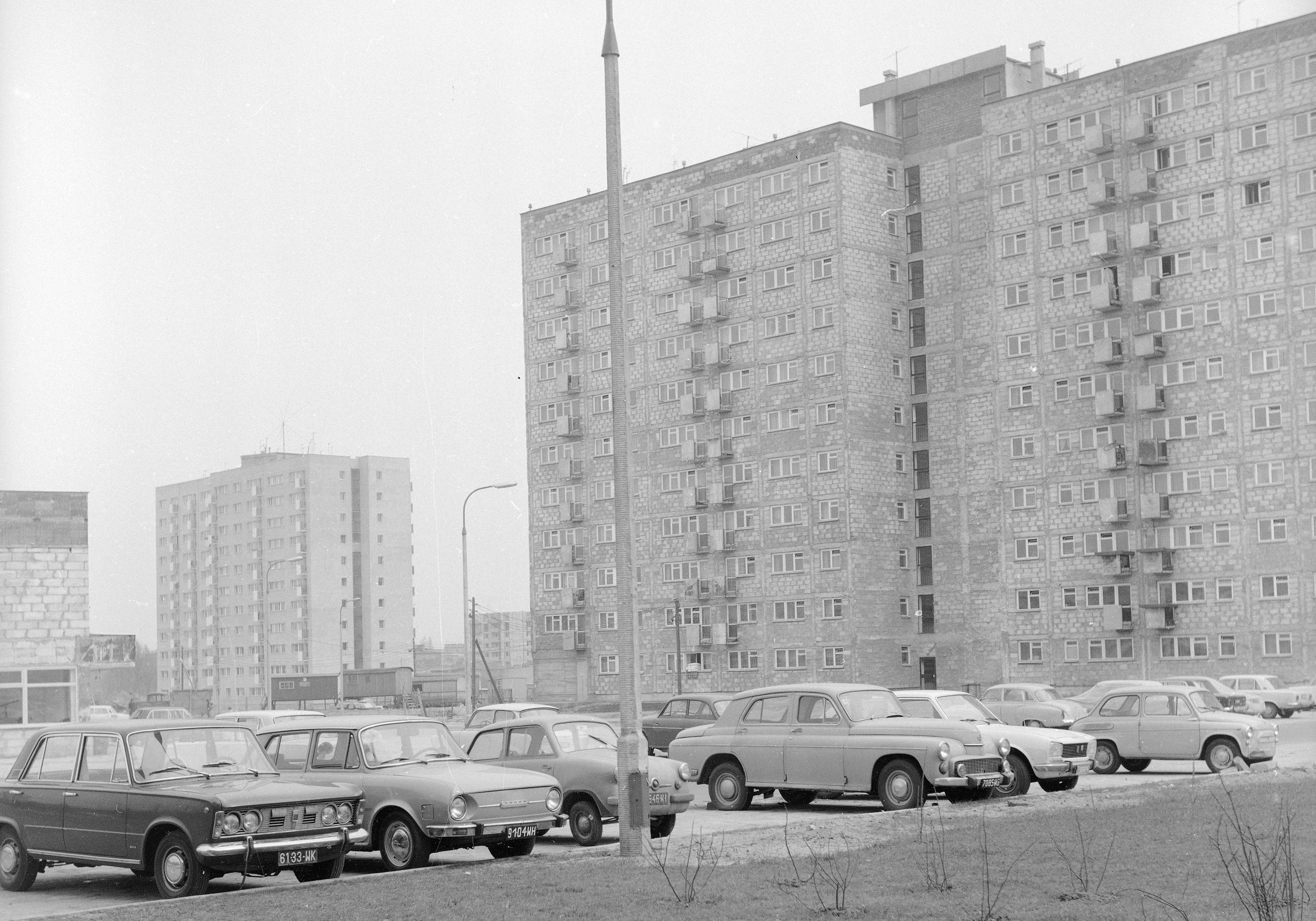
The multifamily residential apartment building, located at 101 Broniewskiego Street in Piaski, between 1974 and 1975.

In the 1970s, Piaski began being developed as a residential neighbourhood. Between 1970 and 1973, the multifamily residential apartment buildings were built around the Broniewskiego Street. In 2002, 4 Niedzielskiego Street was built the Church of St. Christopher, a Roman Catholic parish church.

== Overview ==
Piaski is a residential neighbourhood, mostly consisting of the apartment buildings.

At 4 Niedzielskiego Street is located the Catholic St. Christopher Church.

== Location and administrative boundaries ==
Piaski is located within the southeastern portion of the district of Bielany, in the city of Warsaw, Poland. It is a City Information System area. To the north, its border is determined by Broniewskiego Street; to the east, by Armii Ludowej Avenue; to the south, by Maczka Street, Powązkowska Street, Rudnickiego Street, and around the area of the building complex at 1 Rudnickiego Street and 1A Rudnickiego Street; and to the west, by Reymonta Street.

It borders Old Bielany, and Słodowiec to the north, Sady Żoliborskie to the east, Fort Bema to the south, Lotnisko to the south-west, and Chomiczówka to the west. Its eastern and southern boundaries form the border of the district of Bielany, bordering districts of Żoliborz to the east, and Bemowo to the south.
