= Słodowiec =

- City Information System area (neighbourhood)
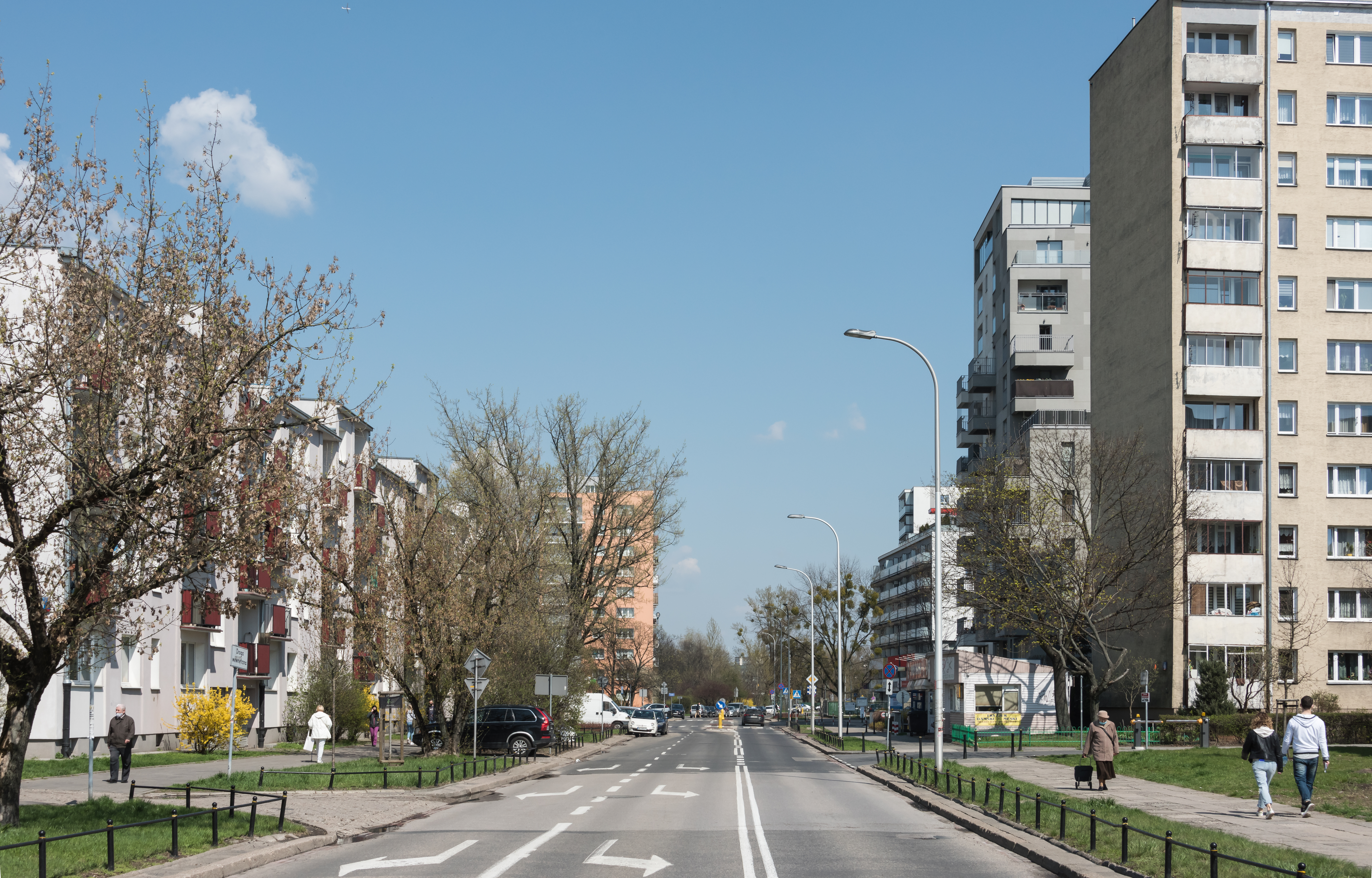
- Apartment buildings on Romaszewskiego Street in Słodowiec.

- The location of Słodowiec within the Bielany district.
- Coordinates: 52°16′22.61″N 20°57′28.99″E
- Country: Poland
- Voivodeship: Masovian
- City and county: Warsaw
- District: Bielany
- Time zone: UTC+1 (CET)
  - Summer (DST): UTC+2 (CEST)
- Area code: +48 22

Słodowiec (Polish: [swɔˈtɔ.vjɛt͡s]) is a neighbourhood, and a City Information System area, in the city of Warsaw, Poland, within the Bielany district. It is a housing estate with apartment buildings. It features the Słodowiec station of the M1 line of the Warsaw Metro rapid transit underground system, the Christian Theological Academy, a public university of theological and social studies, and the Church of the Descent of the Holy Spirit, which belongs to the Roman Catholic denomination. It also includes the urban green spaces of Alder Carr Park, Zbigniew Herbert Park, and Jerzy Jarnuszkiewicz Square.

At the turn of the 14th century, the village of Buraków, was founded in the area, in the 19th century, from its portion was separated a new settlement, called Słodowiec. In 1916, they were incorporated into Warsaw. Between 1956 and 1964, a housing estate of apartment buildings, was developed in the area. In 2008, the Słodowiec metro station was opened in the neighbourhood. In 2018, a new headquarters building of the Christian Theological Academy were also built in the area.

== Toponomy ==
The name Słodowiec comes from the word słód, which in Polish means "malt", and comes from the malt mill, which was built in the area in the 19th century.

== History ==
At the turn of the 14th century, the village of Buraków, then known as Buraków Duży (lit. 'Large Buraków'), was founded in the area. It was a farming community, placed near to the Psia river. In 1580, it was a property of the king of Poland, and was leased to Bartłomiej Zaliwski, a politician from the Liw Land. In the 19th century, it had a population of 309 people. Before 1830, a part of Buraków was leased by the Agronomic and Forest Institute, and developed into an industrial area with a brickworks and a malt mill at the Rudawka river. In the second half of the 19th century, it became a separate village, called Słodowiec. In 1860, a steam mill was built there. On 8 April 1916, Słodowiec and Buraków were incorporated into the city of Warsaw.

Between 1956 and 1964, a housing estate of apartment buildings was developed in the area. In 1975, the Alder Carr Park was opened at the intersection of Broniewskiego Street and Home Army Avenue. In 1994, a nearby forested area was given the status of a nature and landscape complex. In 2000, the Zbigniew Herbert Park was founded to its northwest. The same year, the Church of the Descent of the Holy Spirit, which belongs to the Roman Catholic denomination, was opened at 44 Broniewskiego Street. In 2008, the Słodowiec station of the M1 line of the Warsaw Metro rapid transit underground system, was opened at the intersection of Kasprowicza, Marymooncka, and Żeromskiego Streets. In 2018, a new headquarters building of the Christian Theological Academy, a public university of theological and social studies, were opened at 48 Broniewskiego Street.

== Characteristics ==
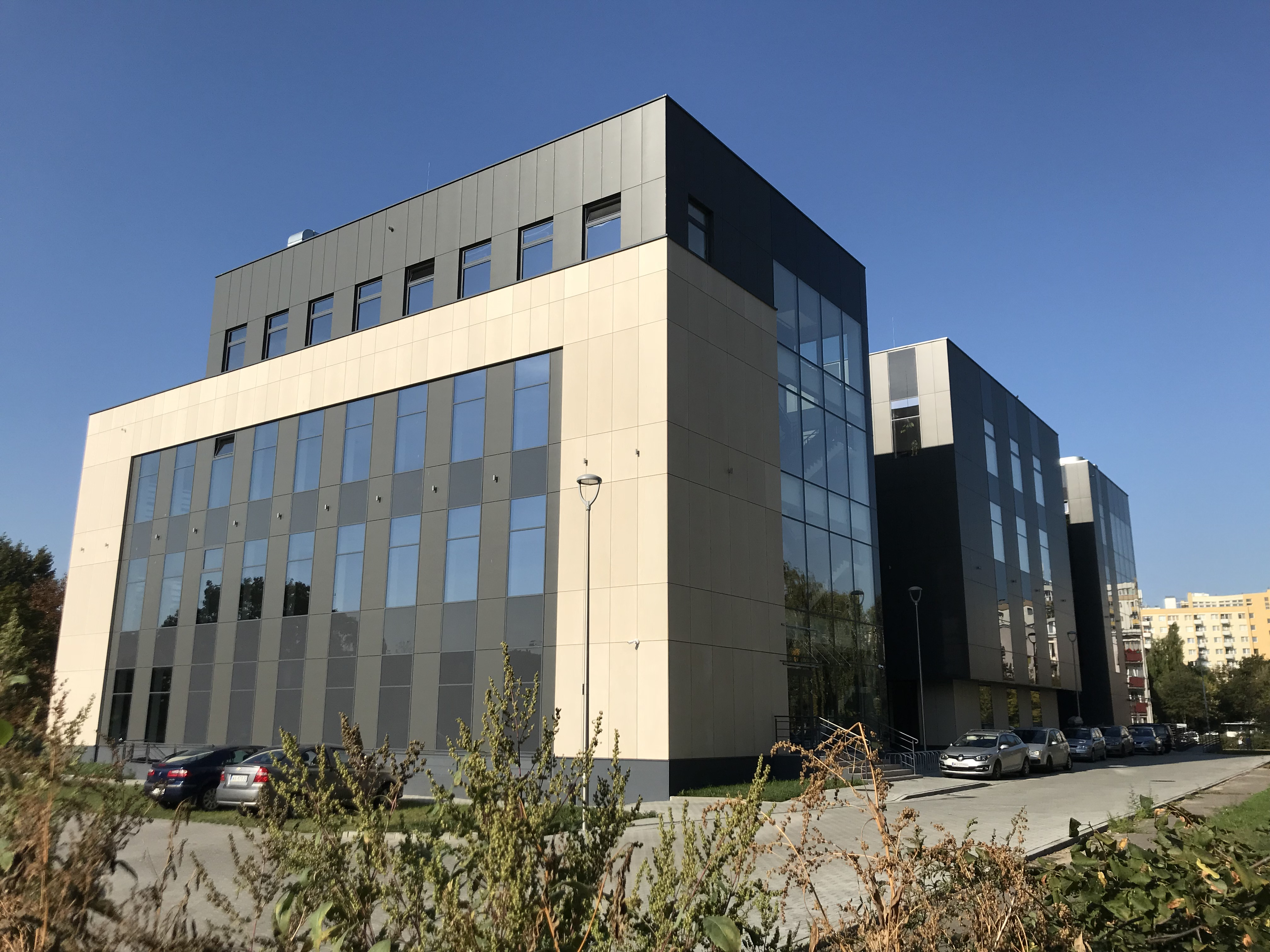
The Christian Theological Academy.

Słodowiec is a residential area with high-rise apartment buildings. Its eastern portion includes the neighbourhood of Buraków. The area includes the urban green spaces of Alder Carr Park, Zbigniew Herbert Park, and Jerzy Jarnuszkiewicz Square. A small forested area of the Alder Carr nature and landscape complex, is also present at the intersection of Broniewskiego Street and Home Army Avenue. The neighbourhood also has the Słodowiec station of the M1 line of the Warsaw Metro rapid transit underground system, located at the intersection of Kasprowicza, Marymooncka, and Żeromskiego Streets. Słodowiec also includes the Christian Theological Academy, a public university of theological and social studies, placed at 48 Broniewskiego Street, and the Church of the Descent of the Holy Spirit at 44 Broniewskiego Street, which belongs to the Roman Catholic denomination.

== Location and boundaries ==
Słodowiec is a City Information System area, located within the southeastern portion of the district of Bielany. Its borders are aproximetly determent by Żeromskiego Street, and Słowackiego Street to the north; Home Army Avenue to the east, Broniewskiego Street to the south; and Jarzębskiego Street to the west. The neighbourhood borders Stare Bielany to the north, Marymont-Kaskada to the north-east, Sady Żoliborskie to the east, and Piaski to the south. Its eastern boundary forms the border between the districts of Bielany and Żoliborz.
