= Halina Skibniewska =

Polish architect (1921–2011)

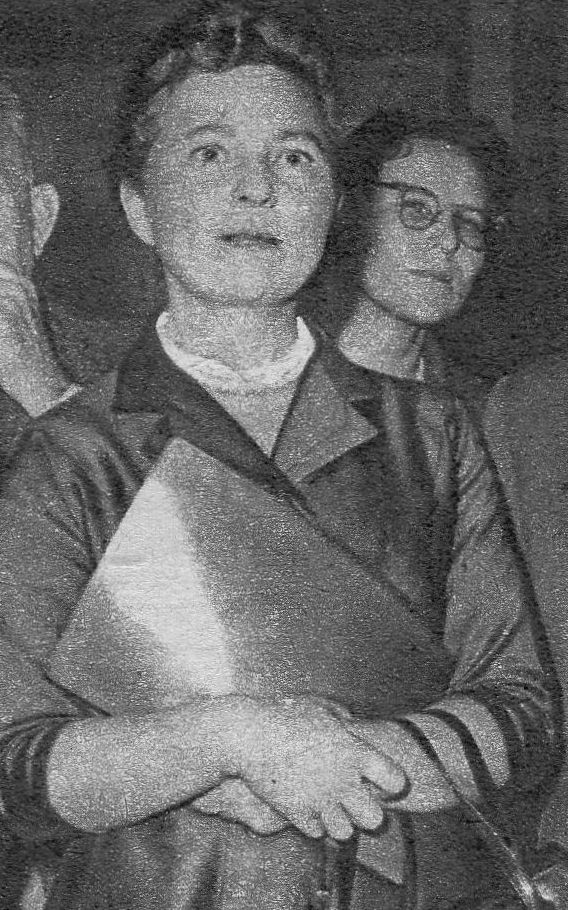
- Born: Halina Erentz; 10 January 1921; Warsaw, Second Polish Republic
- Died: 20 April 2011 (aged 90); Warsaw, Poland
- Other names: Halina Erentz-Skibniewska, Galina Skibniewska
- Occupations: Architect; academic; politician
- Years active: 1946–2000

Halina Skibniewska (10 January 1921 – 20 April 2011) was a Polish architect, lecturer on Architecture at the Warsaw University of Technology, and served in the Polish sejm from 1965 to 1985. During her career, she was the first woman to serve as the Deputy Marshal of the Sejm, a post which she held from 1971 to 1985, the first architect to design independent housing for disabled persons, and designed some of the most sought-after housing developments of her day.

== Early life ==
Halina Erentz was born on 10 January 1921 in Warsaw, Poland, to Ewelina (née Kuczkowska) and Wactaw Erentz. During the war, Erentz worked in the resistance movement and was a member of the Żegota Council to Aid Jews. Entering Warsaw University of Technology, she began working for Romuald Gutt, a prominent pre-war modernist architect during her schooling in 1946. She worked on designs for the Central Statistical Office building (Polish: Główny Urząd Statystyczny (GUS)) under his tutelage before graduating in 1948.

== Career ==
Upon finishing her schooling, Erentz began working at the Warsaw Reconstruction Office (pl) and was assigned to the reconstruction team for the National Theatre. In 1951, Erentz married fellow architect Zygmunt Skibniewski. Zygmunt later would serve as the chair of the Society of Polish Urban Planners. The couple rarely worked together, as Skibniewska focused her work on residential architecture, hoping to address urban issues such as lack of amenities and proper sanitation, as well as overcrowding. In the 1960s, she worked on such projects as Winogrady (1963–1964) in Poznań and Wolska IV (1965).

One of Skibniewska's most known developments was at the Szwoleżerów estate, in which she designed a sought-after housing project known as Sady Żoliborskie (1958–1963). The reclamation project utilized ornamentation, brickwork and wood from derelict historic structures on the estate, as was typical of her work. In the economic conditions of the time, she found ways to economize without compromising the design or integrity of her structures, using an interdisciplinary approach to balance ecological, economic and social factors. Organizing five-story buildings around a central courtyard, which had formerly been a garden, Skibniewska's plan included an influential development of the site. Spaces between the buildings were designed as parks for residents and at the outskirts, she included a kindergarten, child care facility and a school. She continued to work on the project through 1973 and expanded it between 1974 and 1976 to include the Szwoleżerów complex.

Her commitment to socially responsible architecture includes a Warsaw housing project in the Sadyba neighborhood, Osiedle Sadyba (1972–75), which was the first independent living facility for the disabled. In the same neighborhood, she built a school (1971), a day care center and an educational center. In 1974, she completed the ZETO building in Warsaw, the Sokółka Kindergarten in 1975 and between 1975 and 1986 she worked on a noted housing project in Białołęka Dworska.

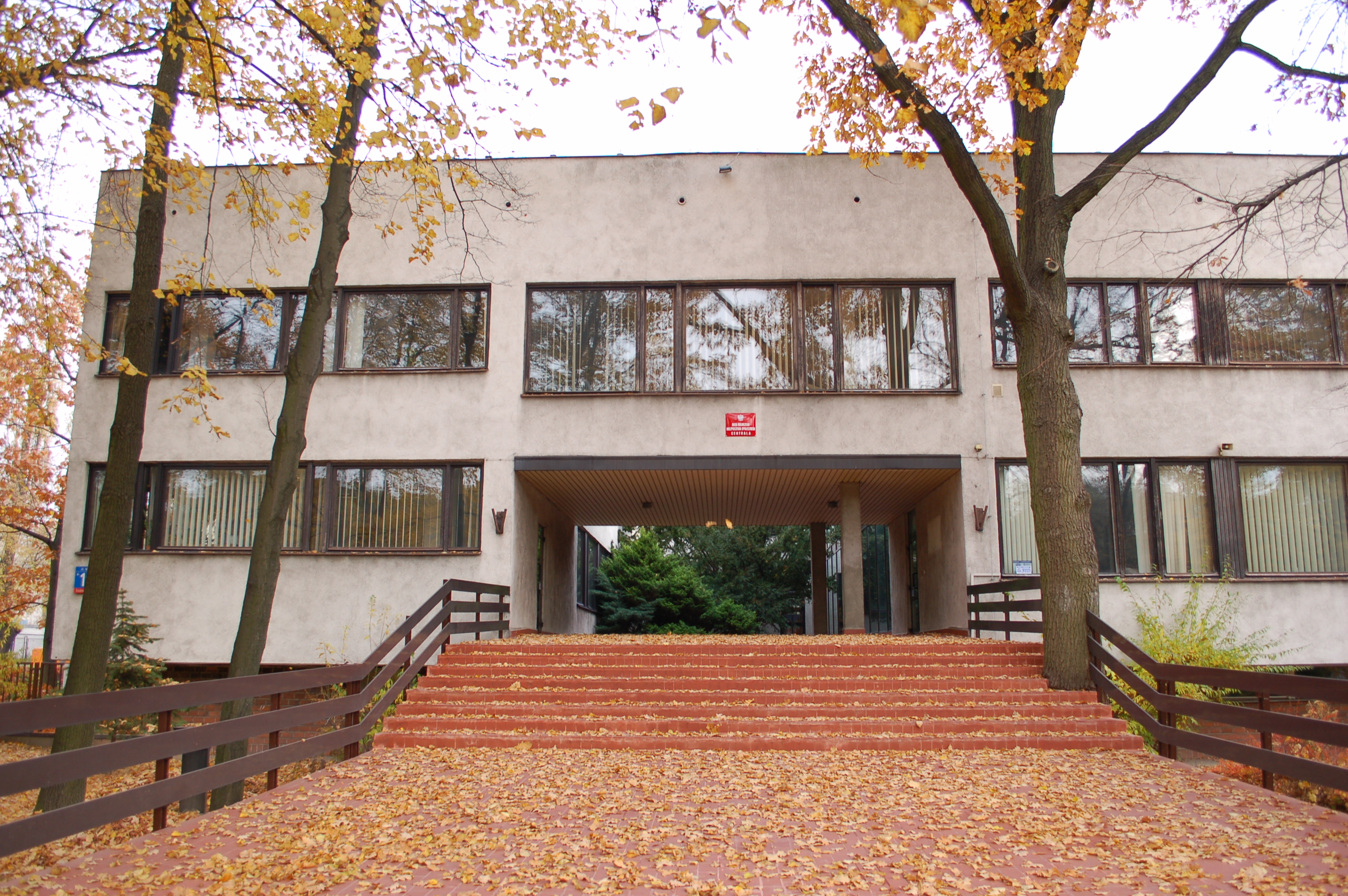
ZETO building in Warsaw

In 1965, Skibniewska was elected to serve in the Sejm, Poland's legislative body, and became the first woman Deputy Marshal in 1971. Re-elected numerous times, she served until 1985. During the 1981–1983 period of martial law, she was influential in assisting political prisoners and those interned under the verification program or facing court martial. At the same time, she joined the faculty of her alma mater in 1971, and from 1975 to 1985, served as a lecturer in the Faculty of Architecture (Polish: Wydział Architektury Politechniki Warszawskiej (WAPW)). She headed the Department of Housing at the Design Institute of WAPW between 1975 and 1991; served at the Interdisciplinary Graduate School of Housing between 1975 and 1989; and between 1986 and 1990 managed the government project on city ecology. When she left WAPW, Skibniewska worked in the Warsaw Housing Environment Laboratory from 1991 to 2000.

Skibniewska won many awards for her designs and social endeavors including first prize in the design contests for Wrocław-Południe Housing Project in 1962 and the "Master of Warsaw" award for her design of the School of Sadyba in 1972. That same year she was awarded the honorary title Grand Officer of France's Legion of Honour and in 1978 received the SARP Honorary Award from the Association of Polish Architects (Polish: Stowarzyszenia Architektów Polskich (SARP)). In 1979, she was recognized for her efforts at creating peace between nations with the 1977/78 Lenin Peace Prize and in 2000 she received the Medal of the Warsaw University of Technology.

== Death and legacy ==
Skibniewska died on 20 April 2011 in Warsaw.
