= Bielany =

- District
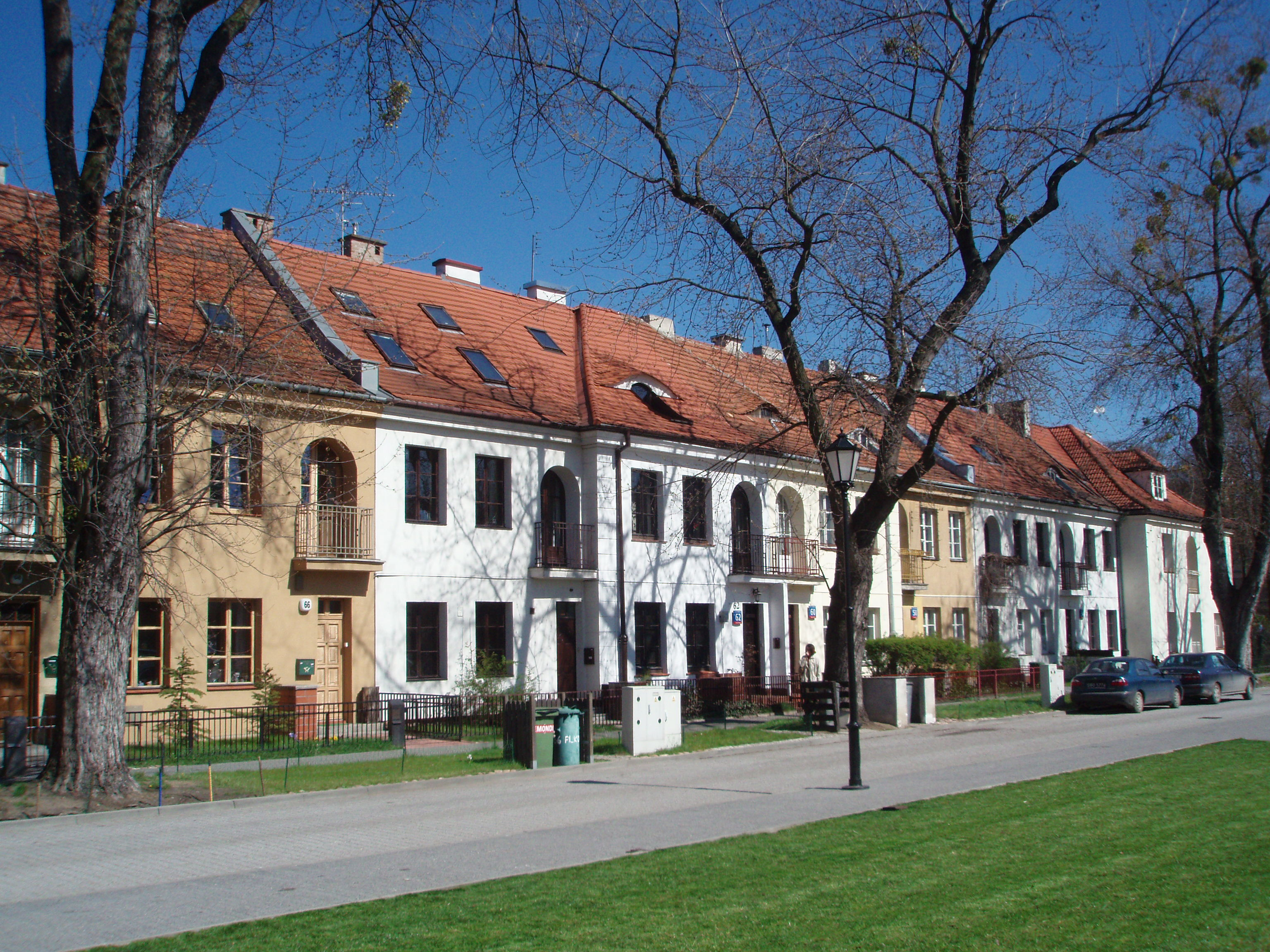
- A pre-war housing estate in Old Bielany

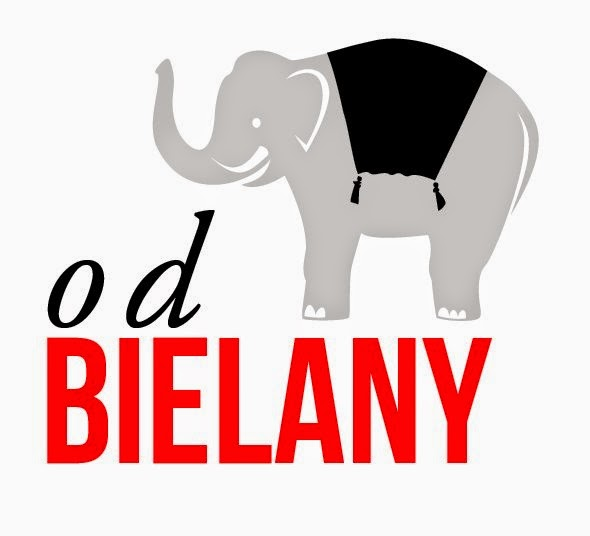
- Flag Coat of arms Brandmark

- Location of Bielany within Warsaw
- Coordinates: 52°17′20″N 20°56′02″E
- Country: Poland
- Voivodeship: Masovian
- County/City: Warsaw

Government
  - Mayor: Grzegorz Pietruczuk (NL)

Area
  - Total: 32.34 km^{2} (12.49 sq mi)

Population (2019)
  - Total: 131,910
  - Density: 4,079/km^{2} (10,560/sq mi)
- Time zone: UTC+1 (CET)
  - Summer (DST): UTC+2 (CEST)
- Area code: +48 22
- Website: bielany.um.warszawa.pl

Bielany (Polish pronunciation: [bjɛˈlanɨ]) is a district in Warsaw located in the north-western part of the city.

Initially a part of Żoliborz, Bielany has been an independent district since 1994. Bielany borders Żoliborz to the south-east, and Bemowo to the south-west. Its north-eastern border is the Vistula River, and the northern-western border is also the limits of the city of Warsaw.

The name Bielany, which in Polish is plural, derives from the white habits of the Camaldolese monks who have an ancient priory there. It is also known for the Józef Piłsudski University of Physical Education in Warsaw, which was established 1929 when it was known as the Central Institute for Physical Education (C.I.W.F.), as well as the newly built Cardinal Stefan Wyszyński University.

== Neighbourhoods ==
- Chomiczówka
- Huta
- Las Bielański
- Marymont-Kaskada
- Marymont-Ruda
- Młociny
- Piaski
- Placówka
- Radiowo
- Stare Bielany
- Słodowiec
- Wawrzyszew
- Wólka Węglowa
- Wrzeciono

== International relations ==
=== Twin towns - Sister cities ===
Bielany is twinned with:

- Ealing, London, United Kingdom

== See also ==
- Camaldolese Church, Warsaw
