= Parysów, Warsaw =

Neighbourhood in Warsaw, Poland

Parysów
- Neighbourhood
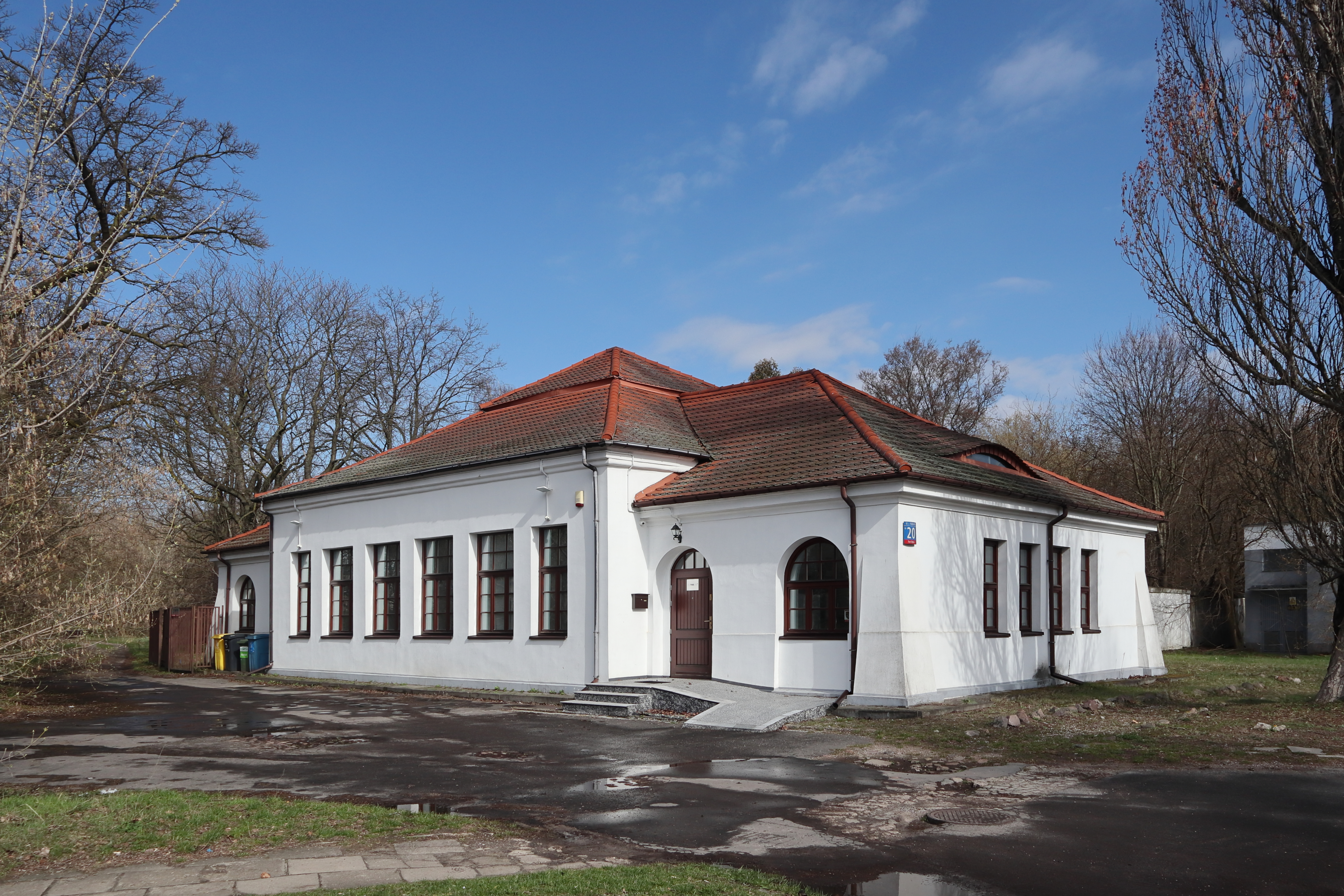
- A historic 1920s villa at 20 Waldorffa Street in Parysów.
- Interactive map of Parysów
- Coordinates: 52.257881°N 20.943264°E
- Country: Poland
- Voivodeship: Masovian
- City and county: Warsaw
- District: Bemowo
- City Information System area: Fort Bema
- Incorporation into Warsaw: 14 May 1951
- Time zone: UTC+1 (CET)
  - Summer (DST): UTC+2 (CEST)
- Area code: +48 22

Parysów (Polish: [paˈrɘ̟s.uf]) is a neighbourhood in the Bemowo district of Warsaw, Poland, within the City Information System area of Fort Bema. It is a small area, centred along Waldorffa Street, and featuring a few historic villas dating to the 1920s.

Parysów was founded in the 16th century as a farming community. It was incorporated into the city in 1951, and was acquired by the military in the 1970s, before being privatised at the turn of the 21st century.

== Toponomy ==
The neighbourhood is named the Parys family, which owned it in the 16th century, with the addition of suffix -ów, meaning Parys's place.

== History ==
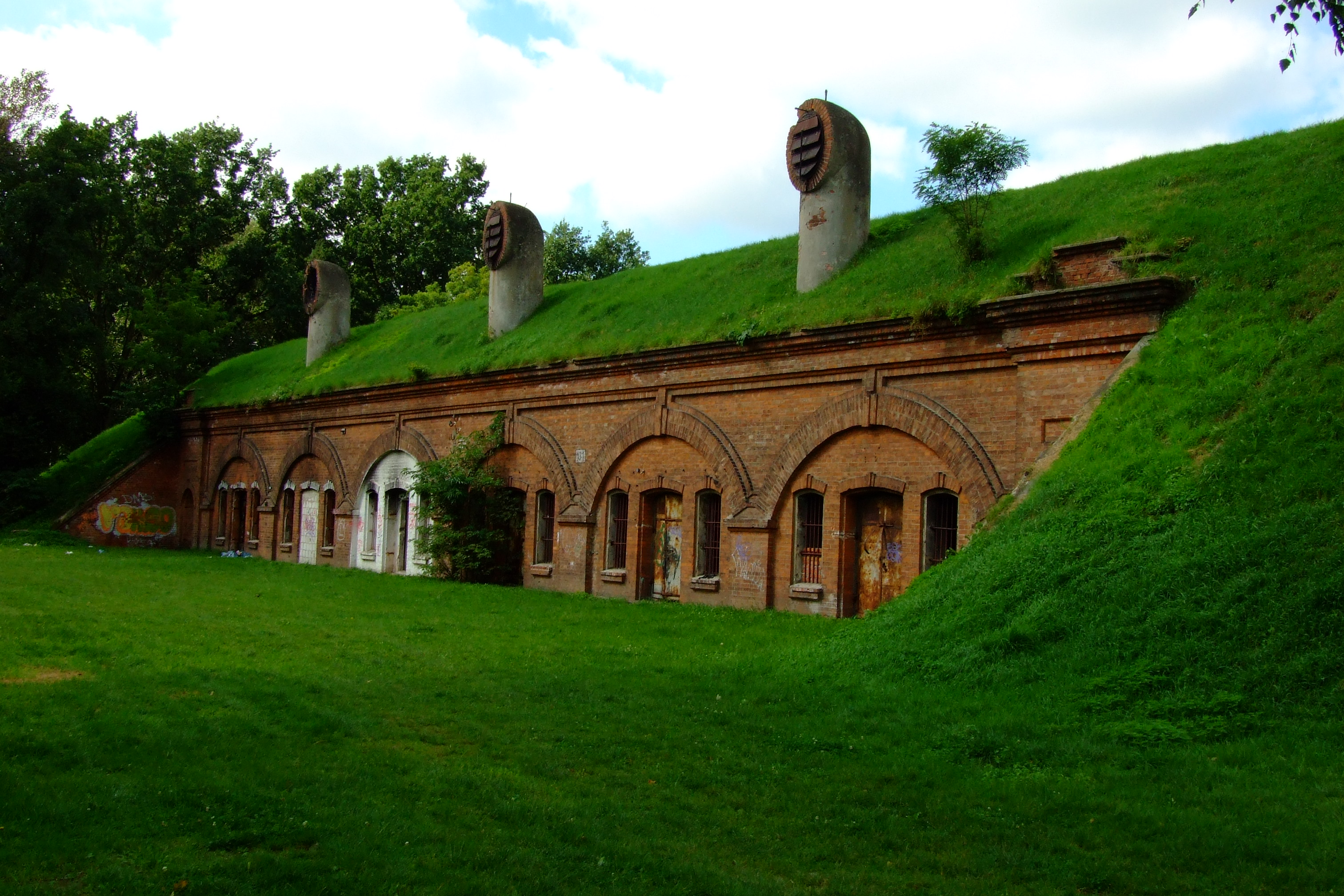
The Bem Fort, built near Parysów in 1890.

By the 16th century, in the area was present a farming community, owned by goldsmith Fołtan. It was later named Parysów, after the Parys family, which acquired it in 1573. Next, it was owned by city councillor Kasper Walter from 1666, and architects A. Solary and J. Fontanna in the first half of the 18th century. The village was located near the current corner of Maczka and Obrońców Tobruku Streets, while its farmlands stretched between Bonifraterska Street, Miła Street, Muranowska Street, and the village of Wielka Wola. In the 17th century, there was also a brick factory.

Between 1886 and 1890, the Fort P, was constructed to the south of the village. It was part of the series of fortifications of the Warsaw Fortress, built around the city by the Imperial Russian Army. The fort was decommissioned and partially demolished in 1909. In 1921, it was renamed in honour of named in honour of Józef Bem, an 18th- and 19th-century engineer and military officer, and veteran of the November Uprising. From 1924 to 1939, it housed an ammunition factory.

In 1920, a wooden building at 90 Powązkowska Street, was adopted into the St. Josaphat Church belonging to the Catholic denomination. According to some theories, said structure could have been the St. Nicholas the Wonderworker Church of the Eastern Orthodox denomination, dating to 1872, however, others suspect it would have been deconstructed by then. In 1966, it was replaced with a new, larger brick building.

Throughout 1920s, several villas were built in area of Waldorffa near the fort. In the 1970s, they were acquired by the military.

In September 1939, during the siege of Warsaw, the fort was defended by the 202nd Company of the 4th Battalion of the 30th Kaniów Riflemen Regiment of the Polish Armed Forces, led by major Ludwik Łukasiewicz. On 9 September, it was replaced by the 1st Battalion of the 144th Infantry Regiment, commanded by major Bronisław Wadas. Despite numerous German attacks, it remained under Polish control until the capitulation of Warsaw on 28 September 1939. While under the German occupation, until 1944, it was used as a weapons warehouse. Around it were built several brick outpost bunkers, which during the course of the conflict, were attacked numerous times by the Polish resistance. After the end of the war, it functioned as a prisoner-of-war camp for German soldiers.

On 14 May 1951, the area was incorporated into the city of Warsaw, becoming part of the Wola district. On 29 December 1989, following an administrative reform in the city, it became part of the municipality of Warsaw-Wola, and on 25 March 1994, of the municipality of Warsaw-Bemowo, which, on 27 October 2002, was restructured into the city district of Bemowo. In 1997, it was subdivided into ten areas of the City Information System, with Parysów becoming part of Fort Bema.

In 1999, the fort was acquired by the city. Its surroundings were sold for the development of high-rise housing estates with apartment buildings. Beginning in 2002, its central area was redeveloped into a park.

== Overview ==
Parysów is a small neighbourhood, with a few historic villas dating to the 1920s. It also includes the St. Josaphat Church at 90 Powązkowska Street, belonging to the Catholic denomination.

It its southeast, the neighbourhood borders the Bem Fort, historical decommissioned fortifications dating to 1890, which immediate surrounds now form a part.
