= Camaldolese Church, Warsaw =

Church in Warsaw, Poland

Coordinates: 52.2956°N 20.9600°E

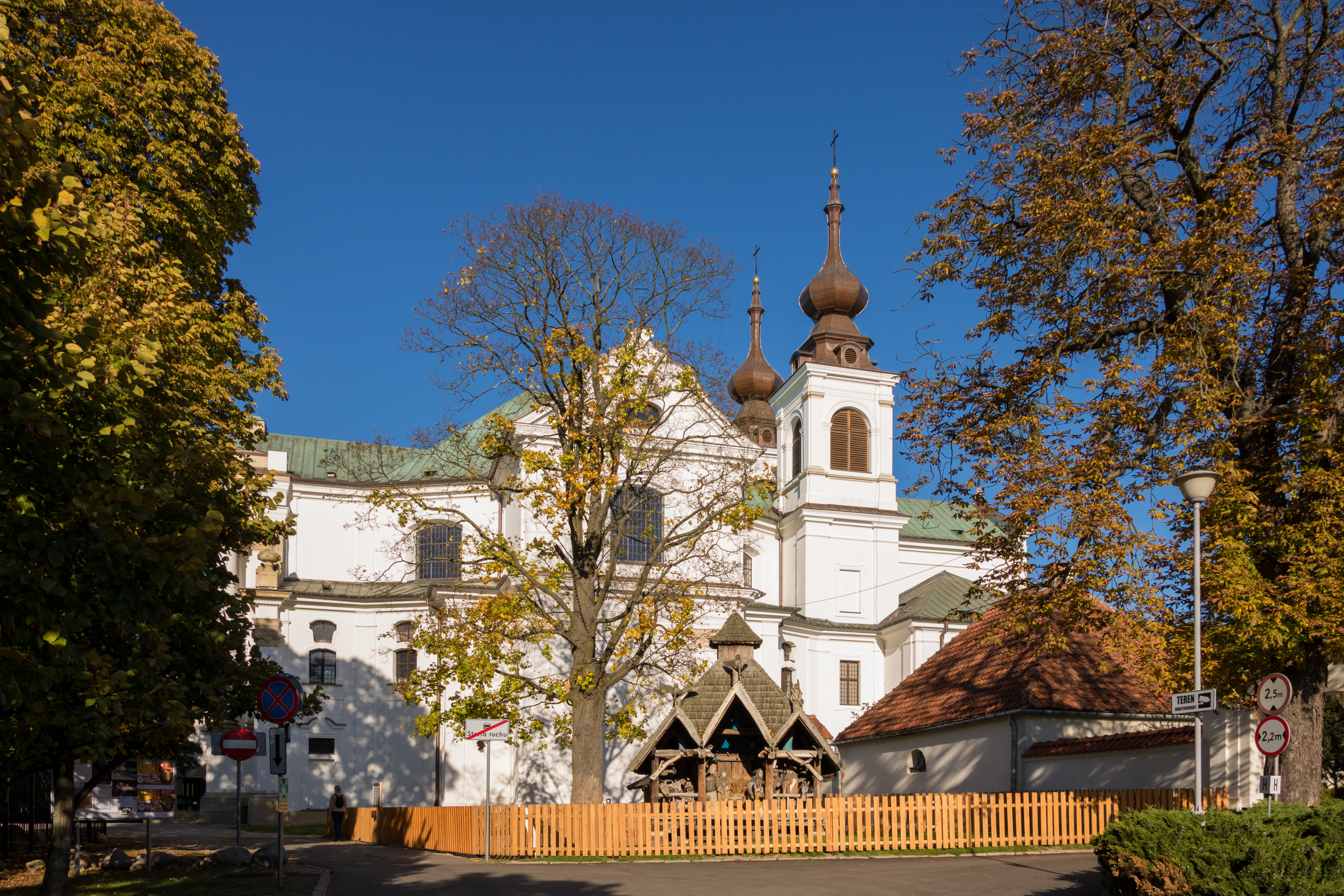
Camaldolese Church, Warsaw

Camaldolese Church, dating from the 17th–18th centuries and situated among the buildings of the hermitage in the Bielański Forest, is a baroque church in Warsaw.

== History ==
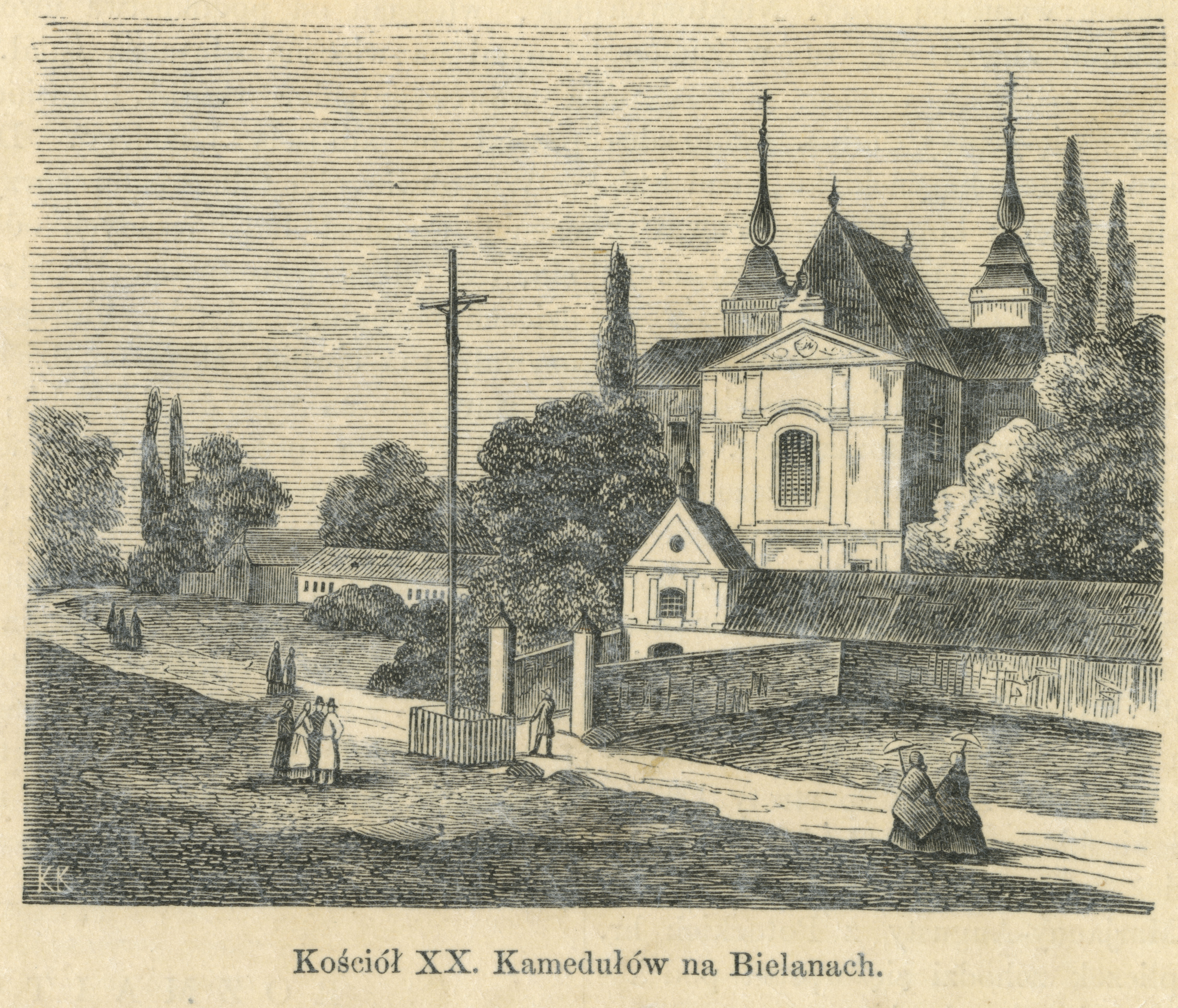
Church and its surroundings in 1861

The King of Poland Władysław IV Vasa founded the first church in Bielański Forest as a vote of gratitude for royal election the crown and winning in the Smolensk War. The church had to be situated in a remote area according to the Camaldoleses tradition and it was built on the area of former village Pólko (now Bielany). In 1669–1710 and 1733–1755 the church was rebuilt, the founders of the project were Polish kings John II Casimir and Michael I. During the 19th century Poland was under partitions. After the fall of the January Uprising in 1864, Tsarist occupation authorities liquidated all Camaldoles monasteries with the exception of the Warsaw. In the next years, Russian authorities took over some of the buildings. The Russians introduced a ban on the admission of new members. After that, the church and hermitages were taken over by the Russian Red Cross. In 1905 a parish was created and the church was renovated. After Russian's withdrawal from Warsaw in 1914 an orphanage was formed and run by Sisters. In 1916 a seminar was launched and in 1918 a junior high school was built in the former foresterium.

Nowadays the church and the hermitage huts are preserved in their original state. After the destruction of the 2nd World War and burning down of the gymnasium building, the former monastery buildings were redesigned by the ATK (Catholic Theology Academy), now UKSW (Cardinal Stefan Wyszynski University), and on the site of the hostelry and the remnants of the gymnasium building there is a modern seminary building being erected by the Warsaw Archdiocese.

== Architecture ==
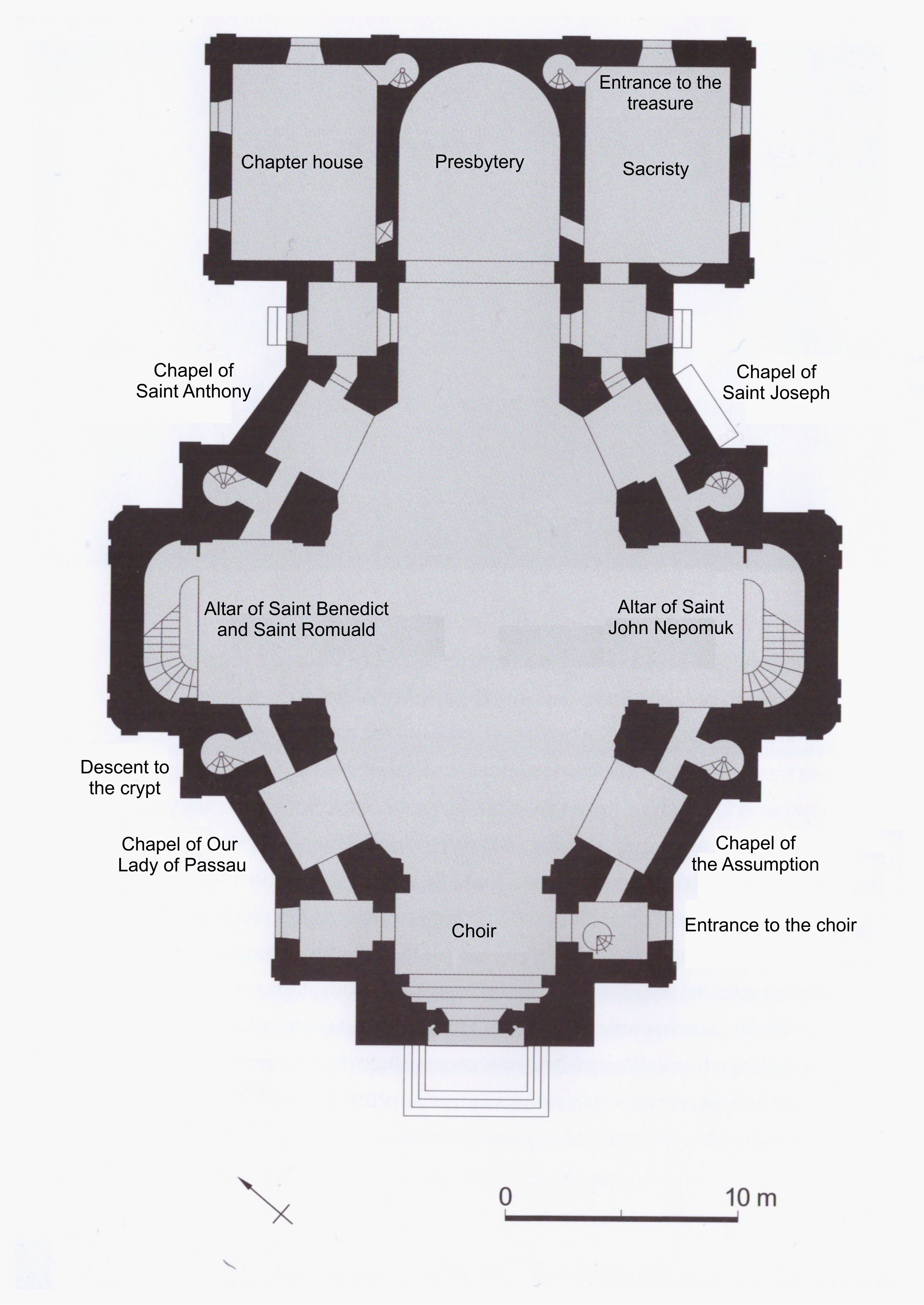
Plan of the Camaldolese Church, Warsaw

Standing in front of the facade of the church we are exactly on the axis of the monastic complex. It is pointed out by the wooden cross standing at today Dewajtis street. From the setting of that cross in 1693 began to pave the grounds of the monastery. The monastery complex consists of a gate, church, 13 hermitages and foresterium. According to Mariusz Karpowicz the church was designed by Italian architect Isidoro Affaitati.

=== Facade ===
The facade was erected when the church with the main body had been already built. The designer of that late Baroque works could be a Roman architect Gaetano Chiaveri. The facade is triaxle – the central part is a little forward of and topped with a tympanum, enclosed in a pair of composite pilasters and columns. Here there are two architectural styles late Baroque and early Classicism. The first of them can be seen in the details and the second one in the central part and columns. In the side niches are set two wooden polychrome sculptures. The first shows Saint Benedict and the second one Saint Romuald.

=== Interior ===
Interior decorations are in rococo style. the church has an octagonal plan cut by cross. Presbytery is a double span, closed semicircular. There is an octagonal nave, which cut transept by transverse axis. The transept is made by two symmetrical chapels. We can observe a great sailing vault. On the diagonal axes are four chapels lower than those which determine presbytery. Consistency adds fact that the whole interior has part of Corinthian style for example columns. Between the chapels there are placed narrow passages.

=== Hermitages ===
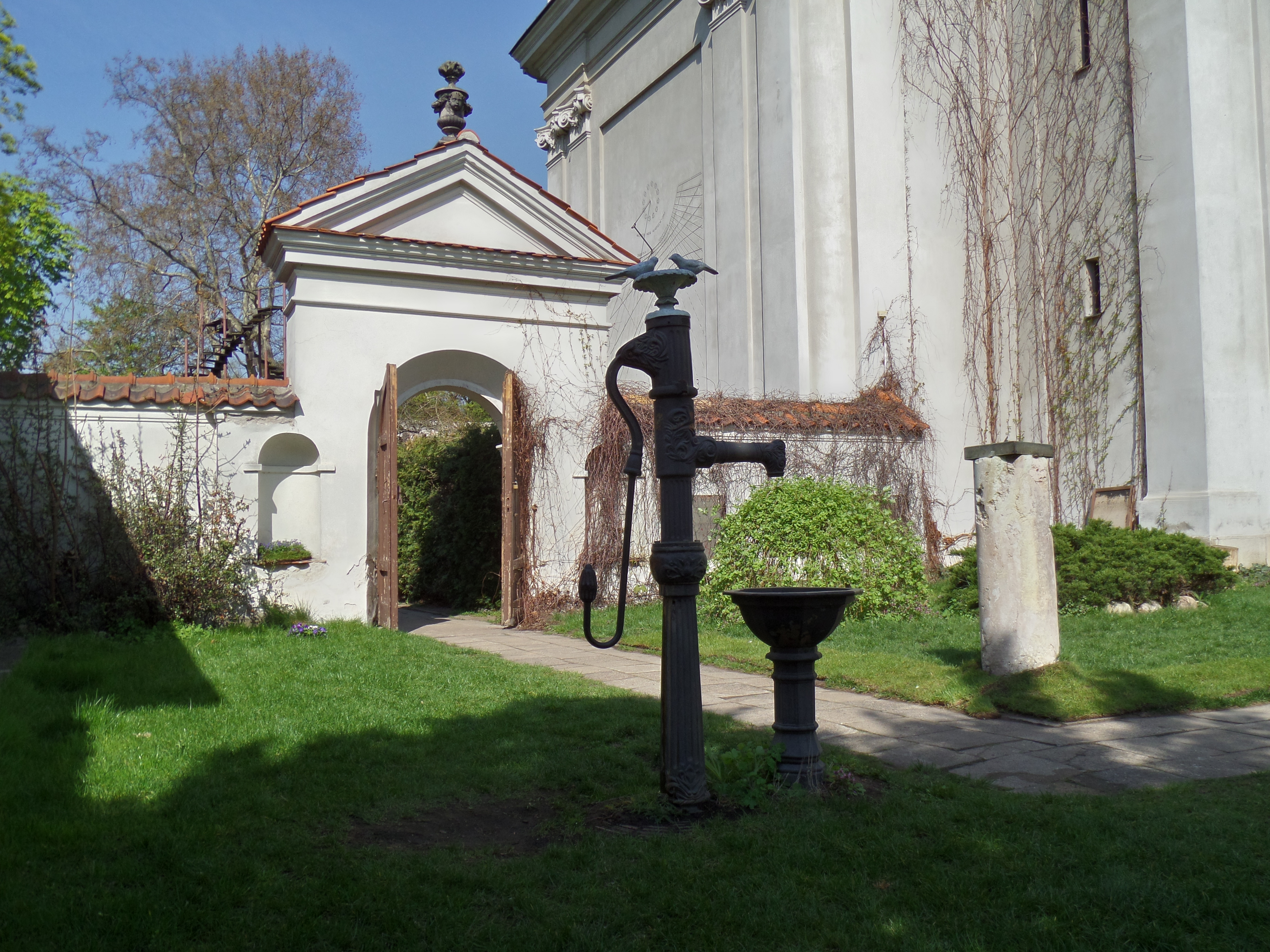
Hermitage Gate, Camaldolese Church, Warsaw

Walking around the church, we can see 13 hermitages. They are arranged in four parallel rows on either side of the central axis formed. Between houses connected by low walls fences are situated gardens. All hermitages have the same interior. In the center there is cross-vaulted hall, on the one side there is a cell and small utility room, on the other side we can see chapel and woodshed.

== Contemporary ==
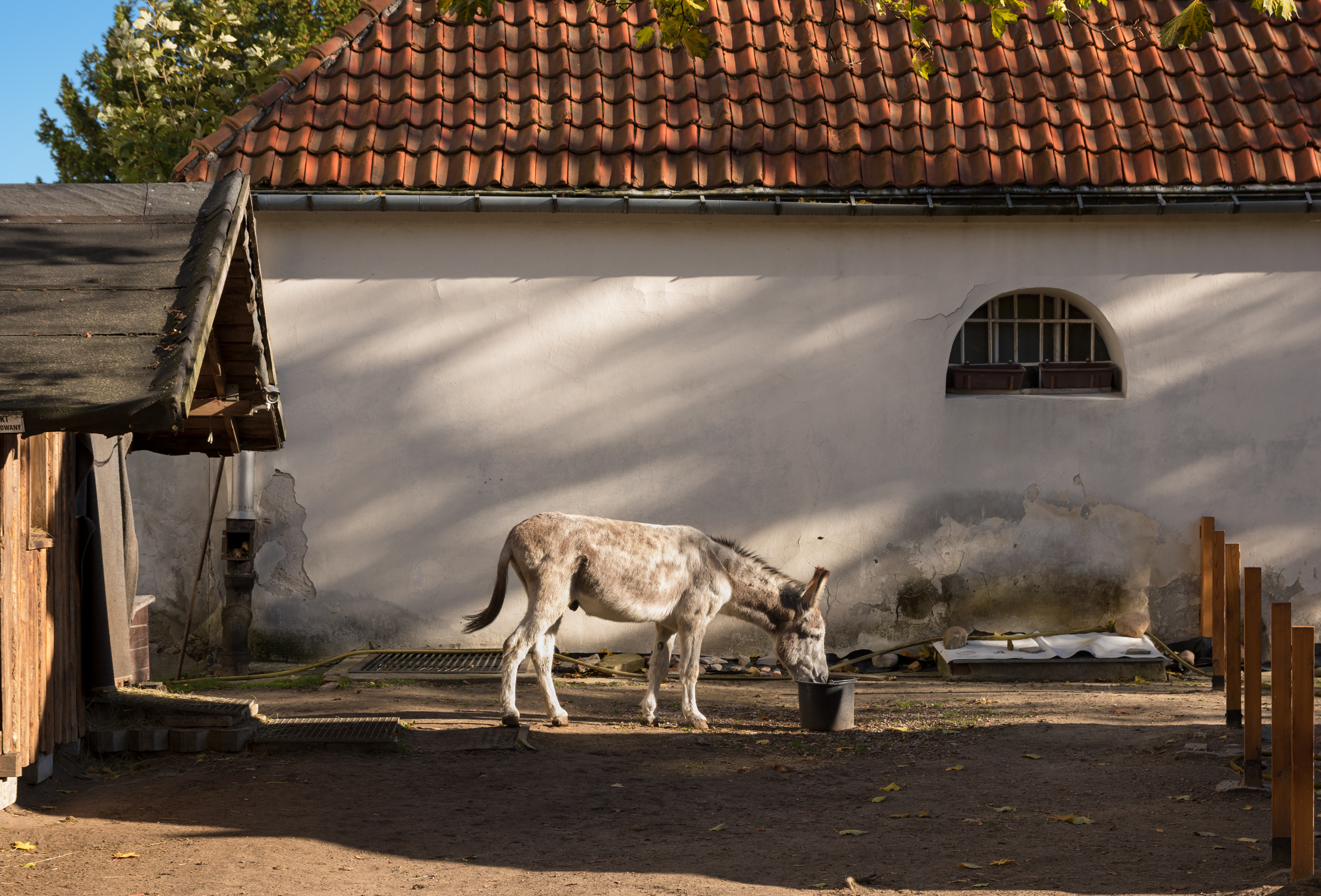
Donkey nearby Camaldolese Church

Today it is a parish church. At present, near the church there is junior high school, high school and UKSW (Cardinal Stefan Wyszynski University). Now the church is also a kind of cultural center. The concerts and theatrical performances take place in the crypt, there is also a café. There are several attractions for children such as a wooden carousel and a donkey. The church is attractive both for local society and tourists.

== Bibliography ==
- Maria Brykowska, Kościół Kamedułów na Bielanach, Warszawa: Wyd. PWN, 1982
- Ks. Michał Janocha, Kościół Bielański, Warszawa: Wyd. Press Rosikon, 2012
- Mariusz Karpowicz, Sztuka Polska XVIII wieku, Wyd. WAiF, 1985
- Jerzy Kasprzycki Korzenie miasta Warszawskie pożegnania tom V Żoliborz i Wola, Warszawa: Wyd. VEDA, 2004, s. 51–55
- Jarosław Zieliński i inni, Bielany przewodnik historyczno – sentymentalny, Warszawa – Bielany, 2003, s. 94–101.
