= Sady Żoliborskie =

Neighbourhood in Warsaw, Poland

- Warsaw neighbourhood
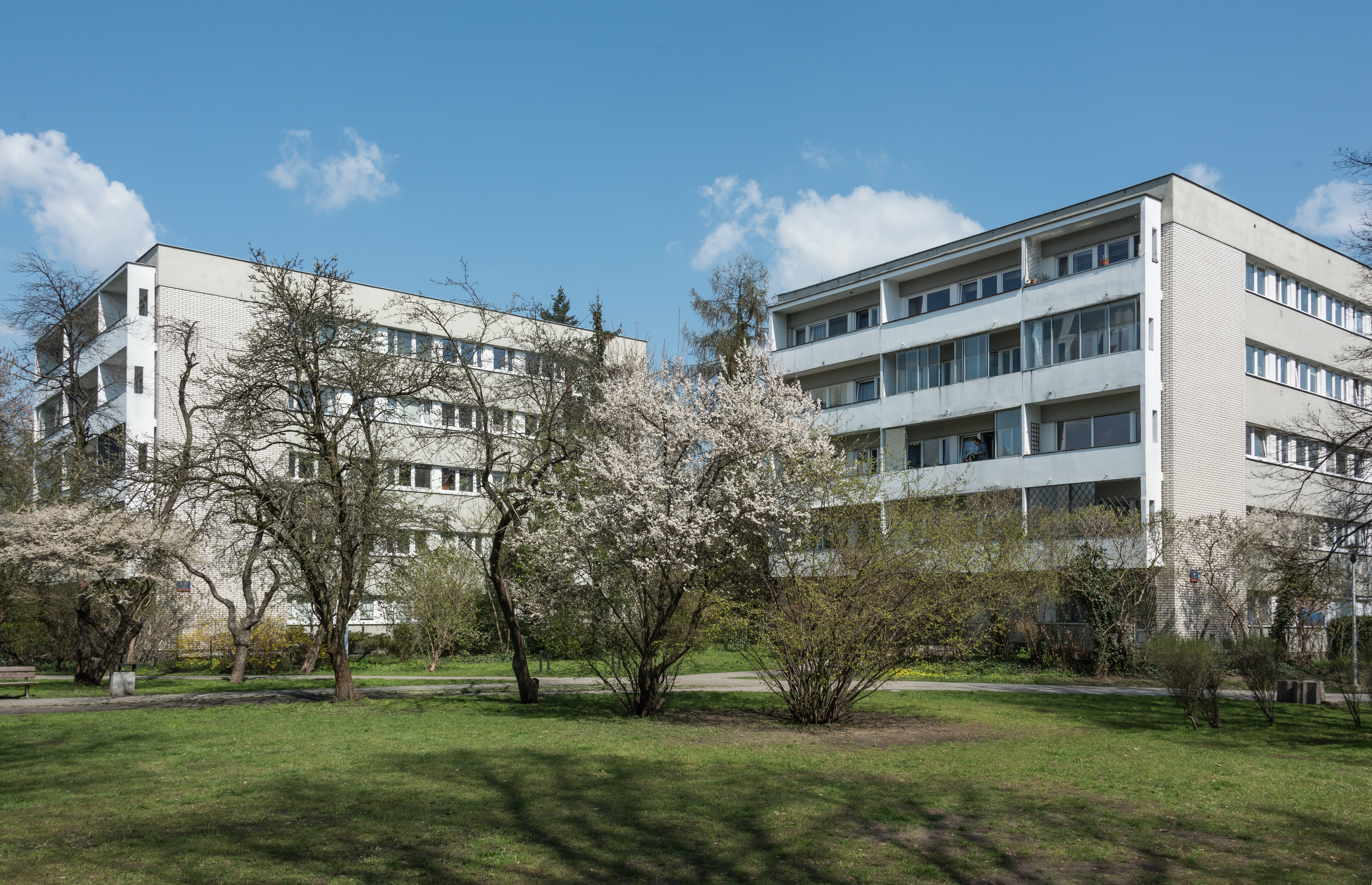
- Apartment blocks on Sady Żoliborskie Street

- Location of Sady Żoliborskie neighbourhood (red) in the District of Żoliborz (blue)

Sady Żoliborskie (Polish: ['sadɨ ʐɔli'bɔrskʲɛ]) is a neighbourhood and an area of the City Information System in Żoliborz, Warsaw. It is a residential area, with mostly medium to high density housing.

== History ==
Sady Żoliborskie was integrated into Warsaw as a part of Żoliborz in 1916.

In the late 1950s construction began on two new neighbourhoods - Zatrasie and Sady Żoliborskie. The latter, designed by Halina Skibniewska, became famous for its greenery, which was conserved when the neighbourhood was constructed. The flats were one of the first in Poland that were built with the disabled and the elderly in mind.

In 1992 due to backlash from the residents over plans to build more apartments in the place of the orchards a park was built instead.

During the 2010s, many new apartment blocks collectively called the Artistic Żoliborz were constructed in the southern part of Sady Żoliborskie, concentrated around Powązkowska Street.

== Boundaries ==
According to the City Information System, Sady Żoliborskie is located between:

- Home Army Avenue to the west
- Słowackiego Street to the north
- John Paul II Avenue and Popiełuszko Street to the east
- Warszawa Zachodnia - Warszawa Gdańska railway line to the south

Notably, the neighbourhood includes a large part of the Powązki Cemetery in the south-west.

== Gallery ==
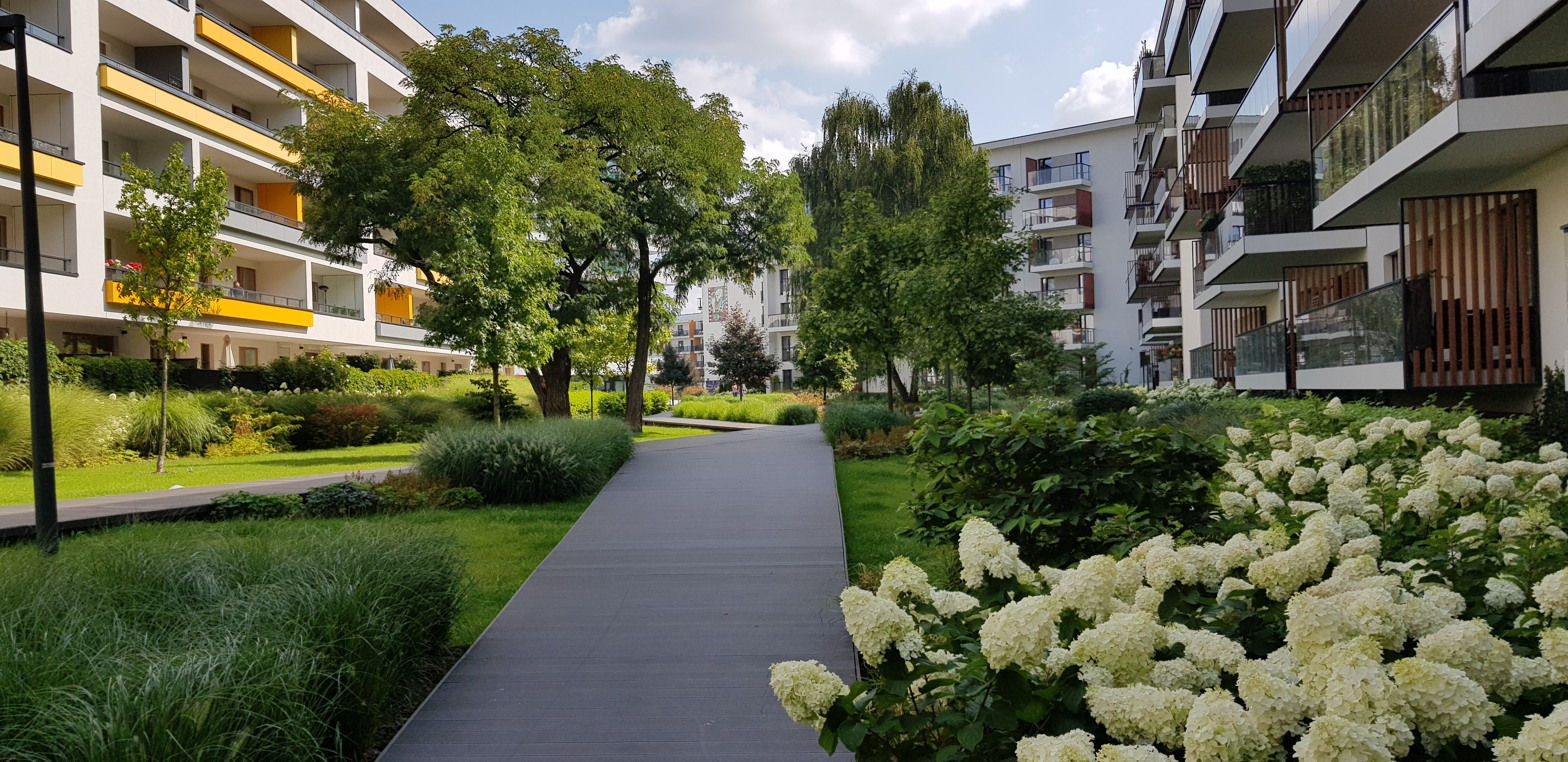
Artistic Żoliborz

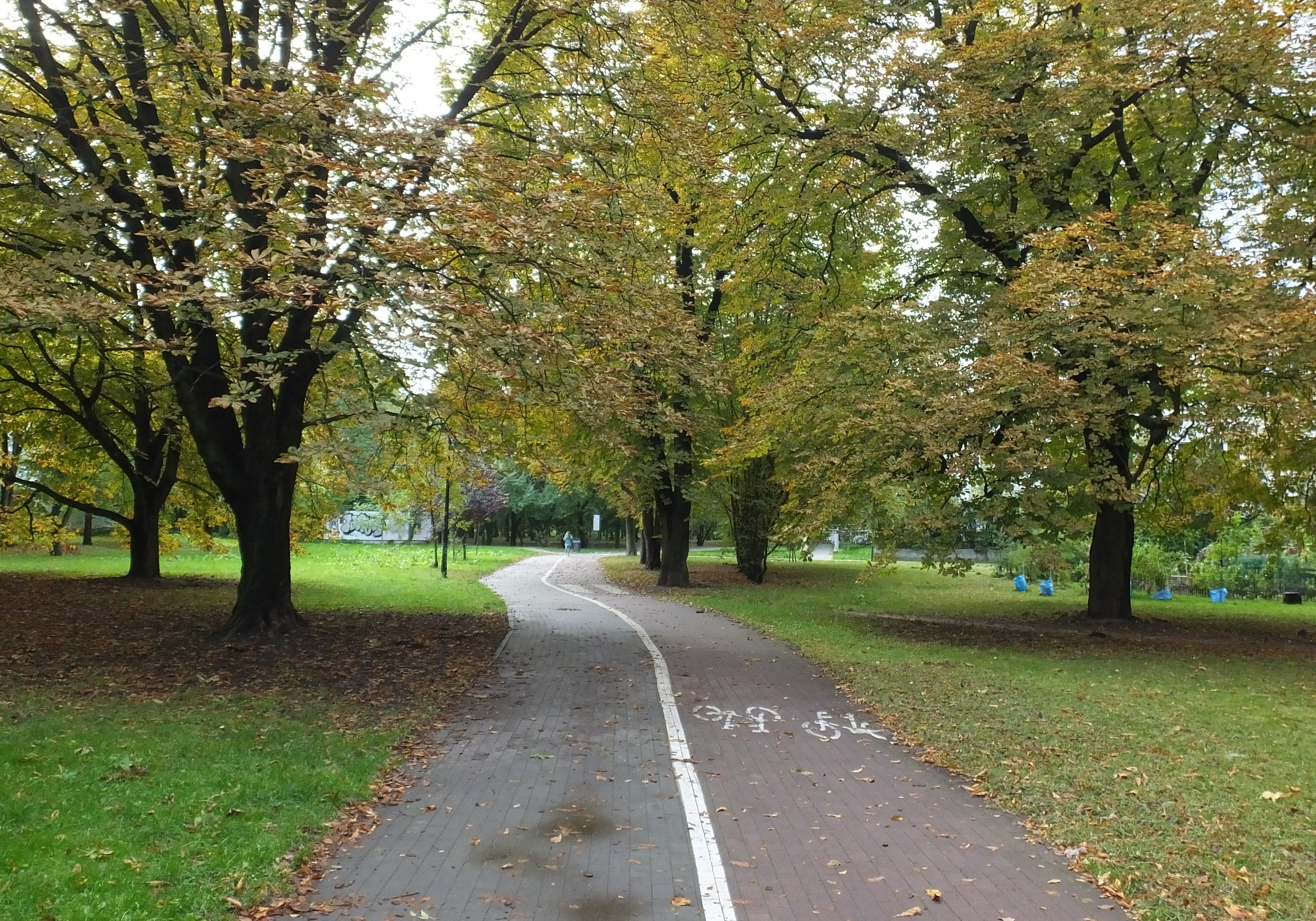
Path in Sady Żoliborskie Park

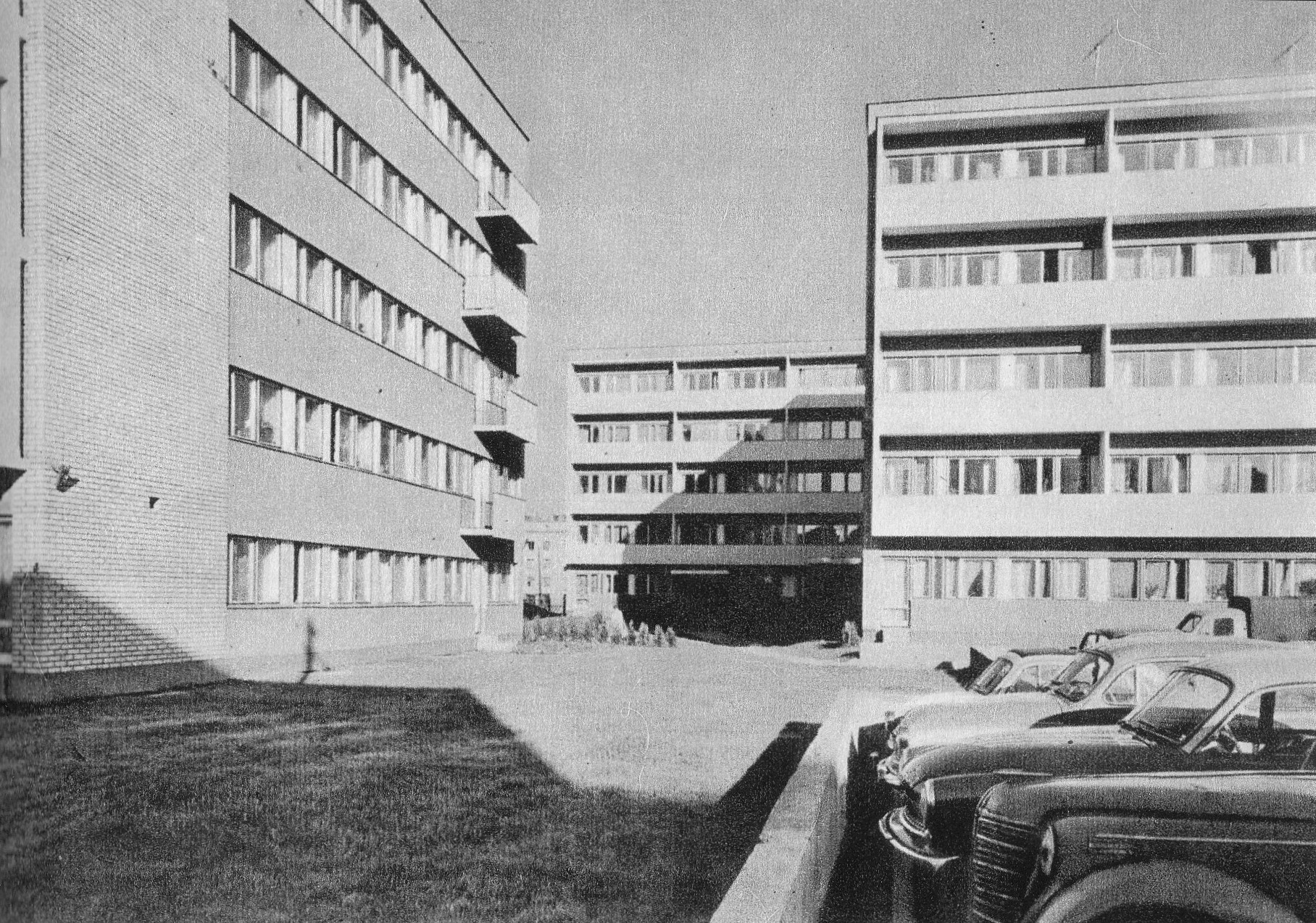
Sady Żoliborskie, circa. 1970

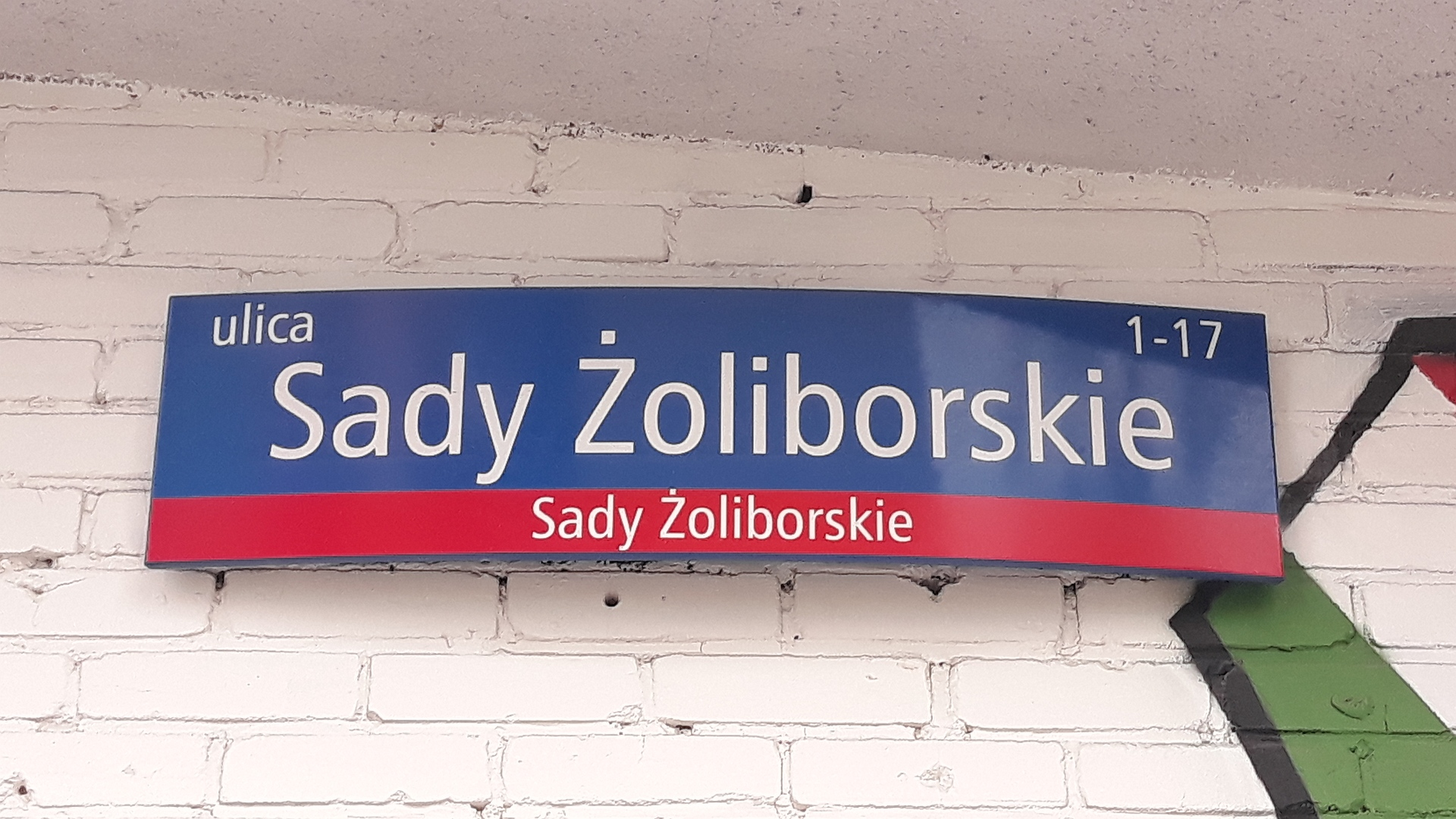
Street sign with Sady Żoliborskie Street and area written on it

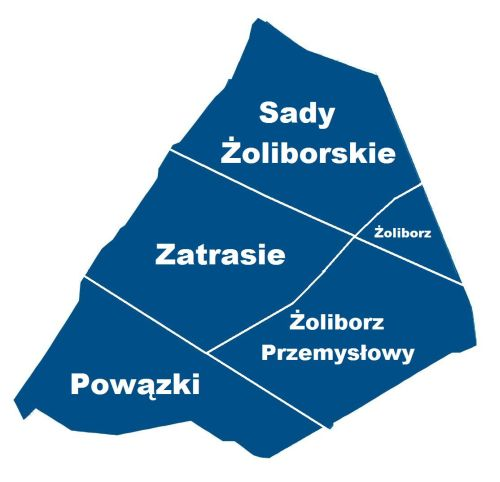
Subdivisions of Sady Żoliborskie

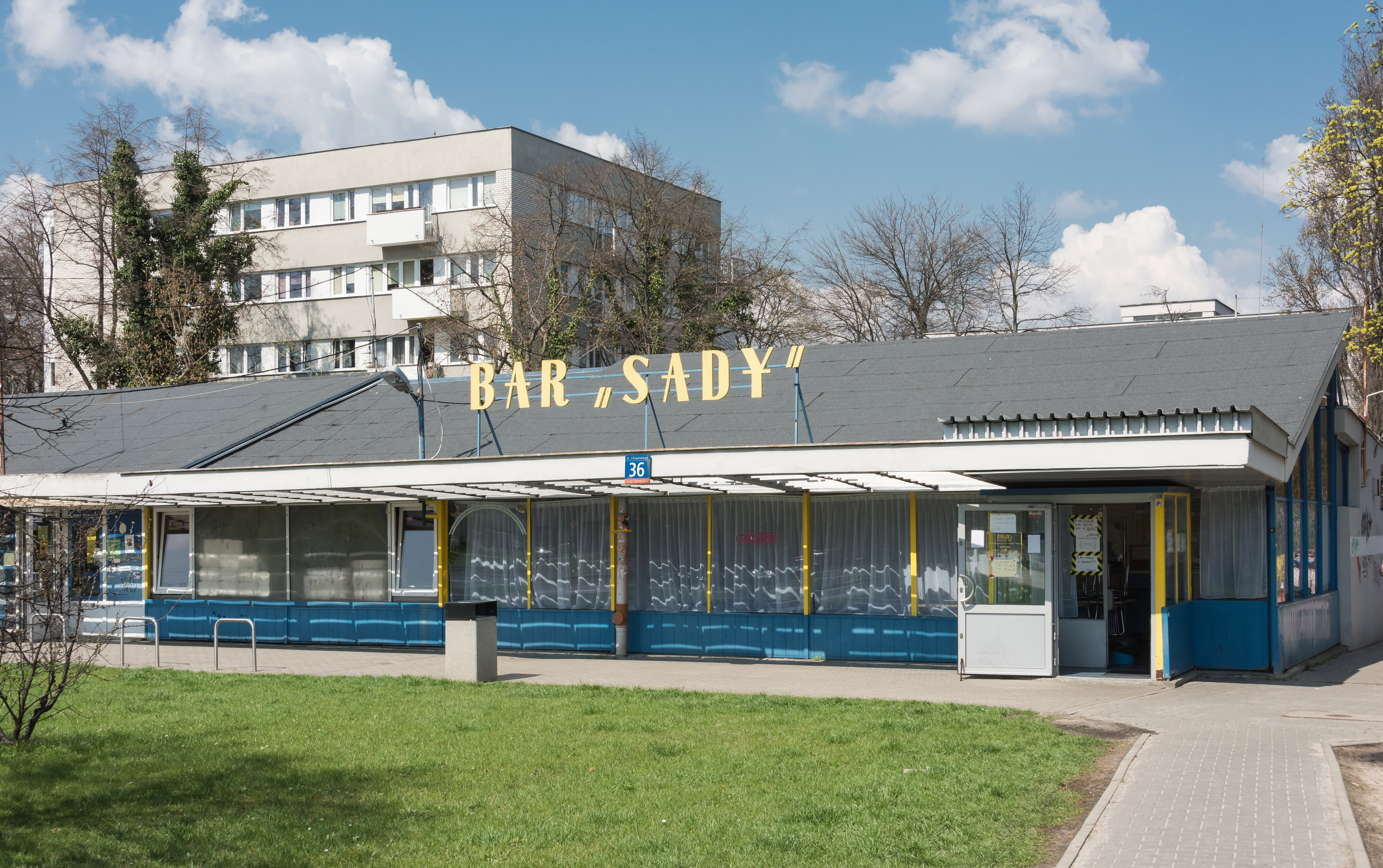
"Sady" Bar

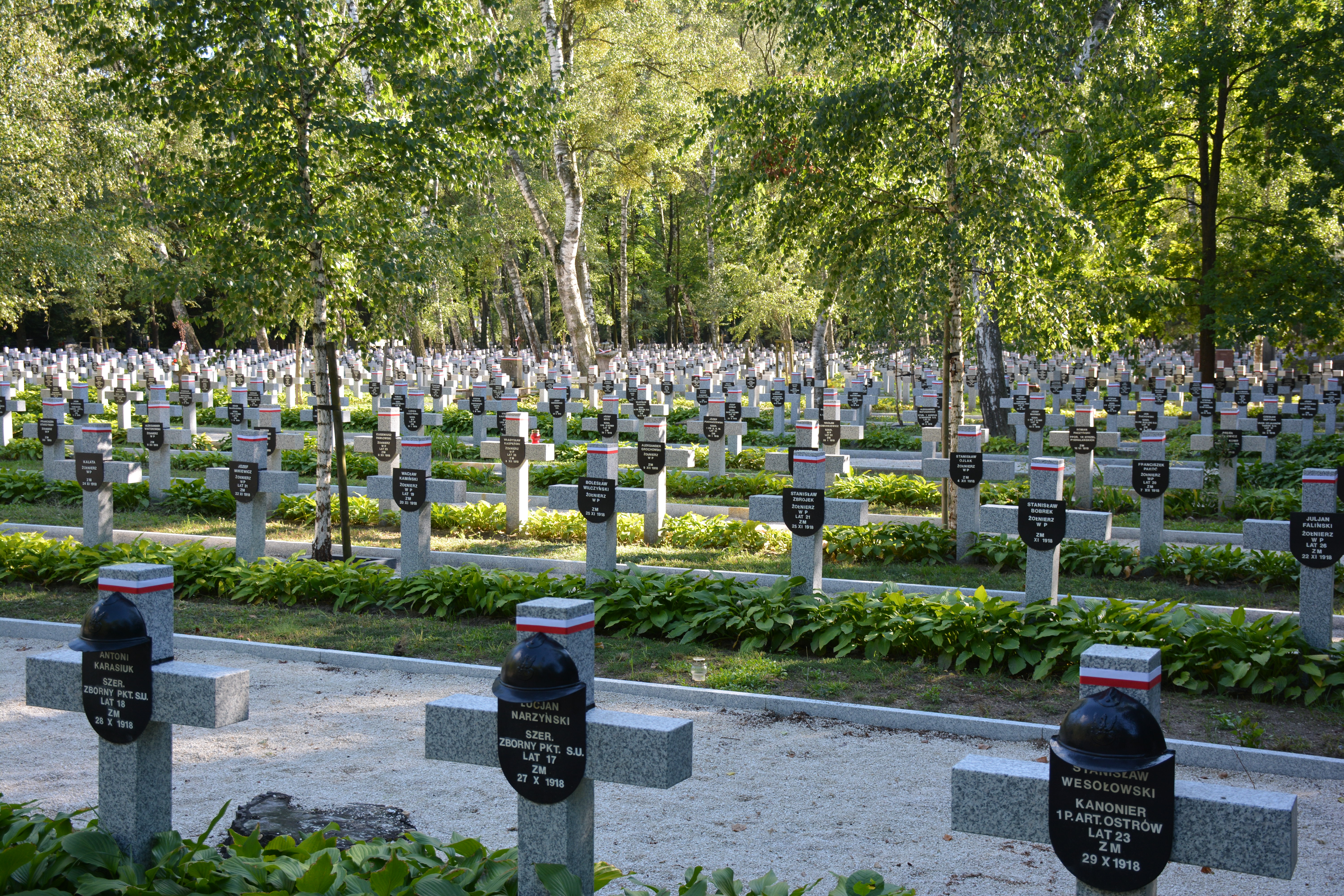
Sady Żoliborskie part of the Powązki Cemetery
