= T-34 =

Soviet medium tank, Second World War

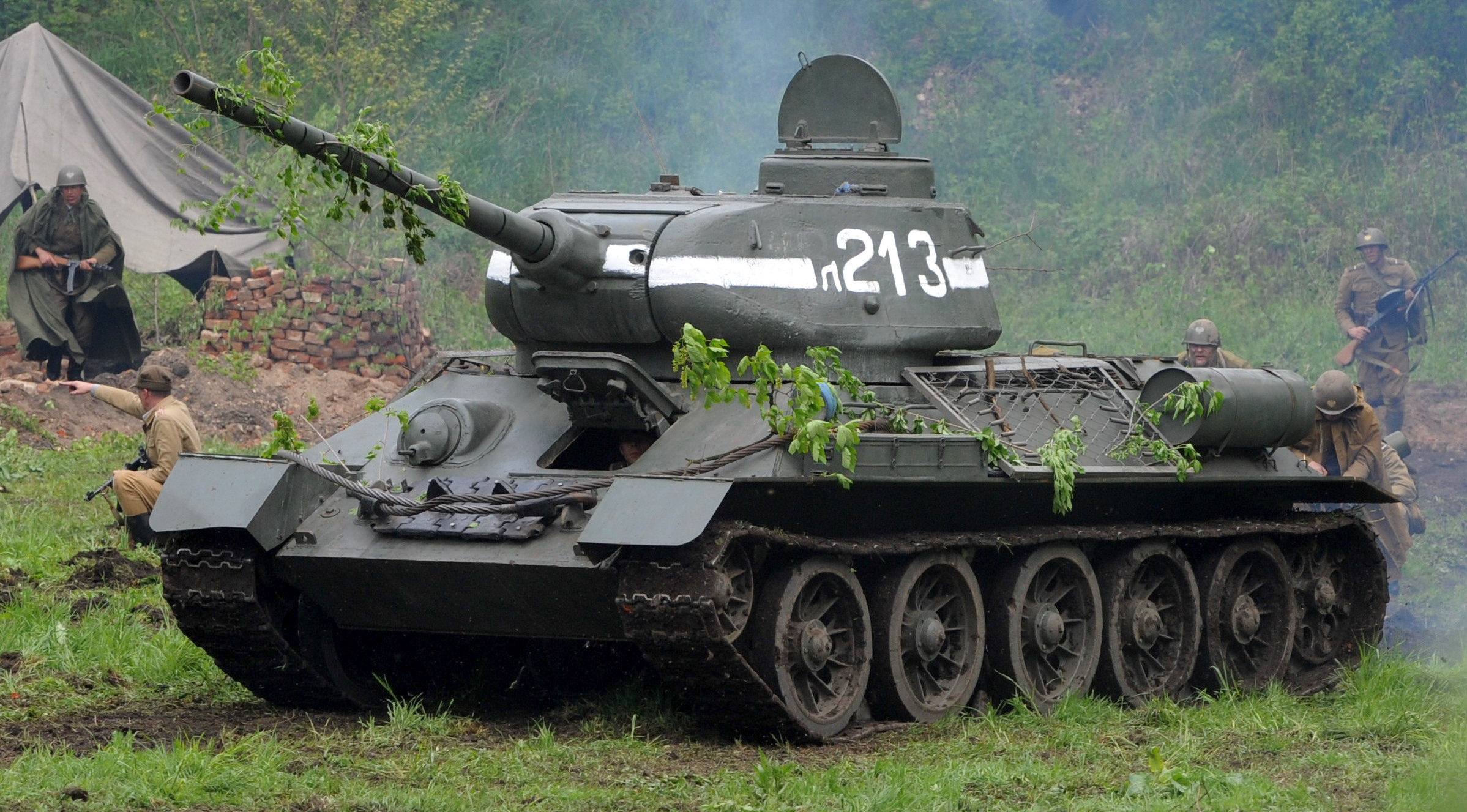
- T-34-85 medium tank
- Type: Medium tank
- Place of origin: Soviet Union

Service history
- In service: 1940–present
- Used by: See Operators
- Wars: World War II; Korean War; East German uprising of 1953; Hungarian Revolution of 1956; Vietnam War; Suez Crisis; Bay of Pigs Invasion; North Yemen Civil War; Six-Day War; Yom Kippur War; 1974 Cypriot coup d'état; Turkish invasion of Cyprus; Ethiopian Civil War; Angolan Civil War; Lebanese Civil War; Ogaden War; Cambodian–Vietnamese War; Sino-Vietnamese War; Yemenite War of 1979; Soviet–Afghan War; Iran–Iraq War; Yugoslav Wars; Yemeni Civil War (2014–present)

Production history
- Designer: KhMDB
- Designed: 1937–1940
- Unit cost: 3,094–9,000 Man hours 130,000–429,000 Rbls
- Produced: 1940–1946 (USSR), 1951–1955 (Poland), 1951–1958 (Czechoslovakia)
- No. built: 84,070; 35,120 T-34; 48,950 T-34-85
- Variants: See T-34 variants

Specifications (T-34 Model 1941)
- Mass: 26.5 tonnes (29.2 short tons; 26.1 long tons); 32.4 tonnes (35.7 short tons; 31.9 long tons) (T-34-85)
- Length: 6.68 m (21 ft 11 in)
- Width: 3.00 m (9 ft 10 in)
- Height: 2.46 m (8 ft 1 in)
- Crew: 4 (T-34)
- Armour: Hull front 45 mm /60° (upper part); 45 mm (1.8")/60° (lower part), Hull side 40 mm/41°(upper part), Hull rear 40 mm, Hull top 20 mm, Hull bottom 15 mm; Turret front 45 mm (round), Turret side 45 mm/30°, Turret rear 45 mm, Turret top 20 mm
- Main armament: 76.2 mm (3.00 in) F-34 tank gun
- Secondary armament: 2 × 7.62 mm (0.3 in) DT machine guns
- Engine: Model V-2-34 38.8 L V12 Diesel engine 500 hp (370 kW)
- Power/weight: 18.9 hp (14 kW) / tonne (T-34)
- Suspension: Christie
- Ground clearance: 0.4 m (16 in)
- Operational range: Road: 330 km (210 mi); Cross-country: 200 km (120 mi) (Note: 450 km (280 mi) and 260 km (160 mi) for the T-34 Model 43 with additional fuel tanks)
- Maximum speed: 53 km/h (33 mph)

The T-34 is a medium tank from World War II. When introduced, its 76.2 mm (3 in) tank gun was more powerful than many of its contemporaries, and its 60-degree sloped armour provided good protection against anti-tank weapons. The T-34 had a profound effect on the conflict on the Eastern Front, and had a long-lasting impact on tank design. The tank was praised by German generals when encountered during Operation Barbarossa, although its armour and armament were surpassed later in the war. Its main strength was its cost and production time, meaning that German panzer forces would often fight against Soviet tank forces several times their own size. The T-34 was also a critical part of the mechanized divisions that formed the backbone of the deep battle strategy.

The T-34 was the mainstay of the Soviet Red Army armoured forces throughout the war. Its general specifications remained nearly unchanged until early 1944, when it received a firepower upgrade with the introduction of the greatly improved T-34-85 variant. Its production method was continuously refined and rationalized to meet the needs of the Eastern Front, making the T-34 quicker and cheaper to produce. The Soviets ultimately built over 80,000 T-34s of all variants, allowing steadily greater numbers to be fielded despite the loss of tens of thousands in combat against the German Wehrmacht.

Replacing many light and medium tanks in Red Army service, it was the most-produced tank of the war, as well as the second most-produced tank of all time (after its successor, the T-54/T-55 series). With 44,900 lost or damaged during the war, it also suffered the most tank losses ever. Its development led directly to the T-44, then the T-54 and T-55 series of tanks, which in turn evolved into the later T-62, that form the armoured core of many modern armies. T-34 variants were widely exported after World War II, and as recently as 2023 more than 90 T-34s were still in service.

== Development and production ==
=== Origins ===
In 1939, the most numerous Soviet tank models were the T-26 infantry tank and the BT series of fast tanks. The T-26 was slow-moving, designed to keep pace with infantry on the ground. The BT tanks were cavalry tanks: fast-moving and light, designed for manoeuver warfare. Both were Soviet developments of foreign designs from the early 1930s: the T-26 was based on the British Vickers 6-ton, and the BT tanks were based on a design from American engineer J. Walter Christie.

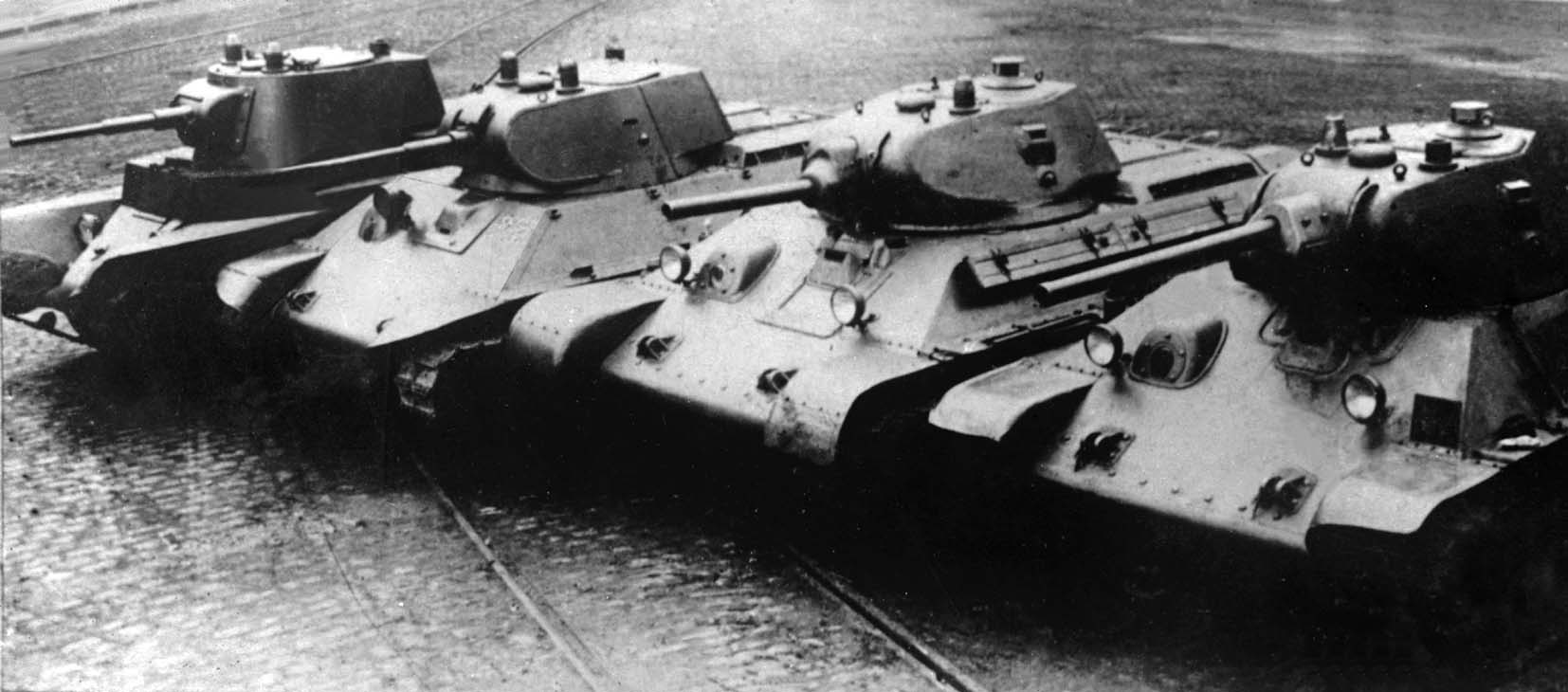
BT-7, A-20, T-34 (model 1940), and T-34 (model 1941)

In 1937, the Red Army assigned engineer Mikhail Koshkin to lead a new team to design a replacement for the BT tanks at the Kharkiv Komintern Locomotive Plant (KhPZ). The prototype tank, designated A-20, had a modified BA-20 engine and was specified with 20 mm (0.8 in) of armour and a 45 mm (1.77 in) gun. The production model used a Model V-2-34 engine designed by Konstantin Chelpan which ran on less-flammable diesel fuel and had a V12 configuration. It also had an 8×6-wheel convertible drive similar to the BT tank's 8×2, which allowed it to run on wheels without caterpillar tracks. This feature had greatly saved on maintenance and repair of the unreliable tank tracks of the early 1930s, and allowed tanks to exceed 85 kilometres per hour (53 mph) on roads, but gave no advantage in combat and its complexity made it difficult to maintain. By 1937–38, track design had improved and the designers considered it a waste of space, weight, and maintenance resources, despite the road speed advantage. The A-20 also incorporated previous research (BT-IS and BT-SW-2 projects) into sloped armour: its all-round sloped armour plates were more likely to deflect rounds than perpendicular armour.

During the Battle of Lake Khasan in July 1938 and the Battles of Khalkhin Gol in 1939, an undeclared border war with Japan on the frontier with occupied Manchuria, the Soviets deployed numerous tanks against the Imperial Japanese Army (IJA). Although the IJA Type 95 Ha-Go light tanks had diesel engines, the Red Army's T-26 and BT tanks used petrol engines which, while common in tank designs of the time, often burst into flames when hit by IJA tank-killer teams using Molotov cocktails. Poor-quality welds in the Soviet armour plates left small gaps between them, and flaming petrol from the Molotov cocktails easily seeped into the fighting and engine compartment; portions of the armour plating that had been assembled with rivets also proved to be vulnerable. The Soviet tanks were also easily destroyed by the Japanese Type 95 tank's 37 mm gunfire, despite the low velocity of that gun, or "at any other slightest provocation". The use of riveted armour led to a problem whereby the impact of enemy shells, even if they failed to disable the tank or kill the crew on their own, would cause the rivets to break off and become projectiles inside the tank.

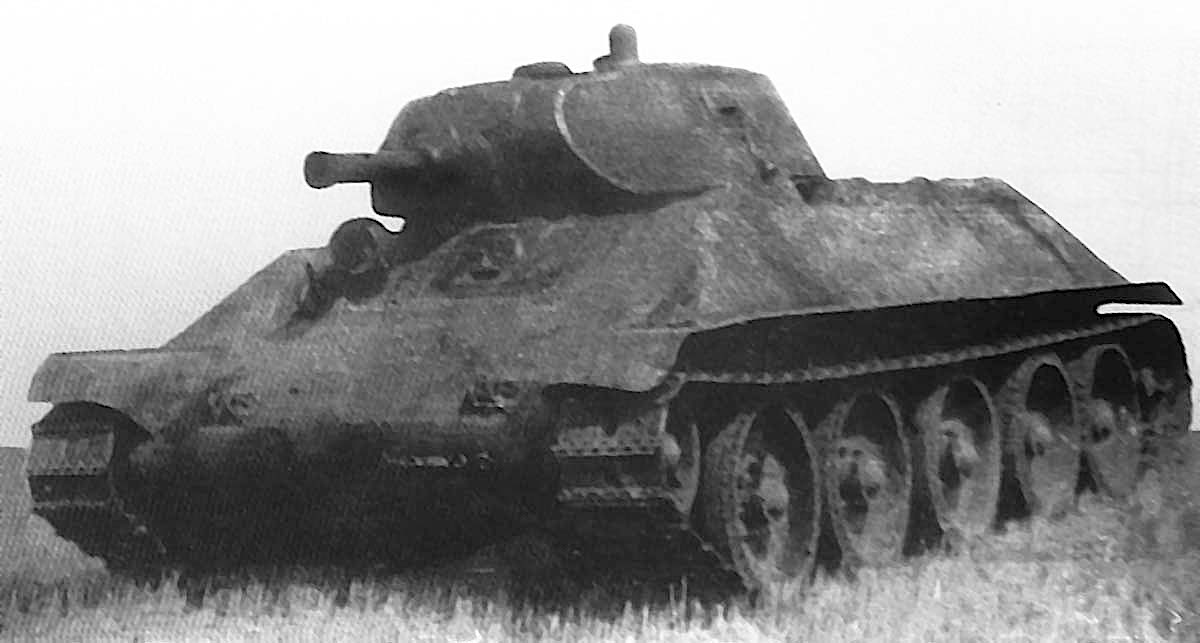
Medium tank A-32

After these battles, Koshkin convinced Soviet leader Joseph Stalin to let him develop a second prototype, a more heavily armed and armoured "universal tank" that reflected the lessons learned and could replace both the T-26 and the BT tanks. Koshkin named the second prototype A-32, after its 32 mm (1.3 in) of frontal armour. It had an L-10 76.2 mm (3 in) gun, and the same Model V-2-34 diesel. Both were tested in field trials at Kubinka in 1939, with the heavier A-32 proving to be as mobile as the A-20. A still heavier version of the A-32, with 45 mm (1.77 in) of front armour, wider tracks, and a newer L-11 76.2 mm gun, was approved for production as the T-34. Koshkin chose the name after the year 1934, when he began to formulate his ideas about the new tank, and to commemorate that year's decree expanding the armoured force and appointing Sergo Ordzhonikidze to head tank production.

Valuable lessons from Lake Khasan and Khalkhin Gol regarding armour protection, mobility, quality welding, and main guns were incorporated into the new T-34 tank, which represented a substantial improvement over the BT and T-26 tanks in all four areas. Koshkin's team completed two prototype T-34s in January 1940. In April and May, they underwent a gruelling 2,000-kilometre (1,200 mi) drive from Kharkiv to Moscow for a demonstration for the Kremlin leaders, to the Mannerheim Line in Finland, and back to Kharkiv via Minsk and Kiev. Some drivetrain shortcomings were identified and corrected. On this journey, Mikhail Koshkin died of pneumonia. Freezing temperatures, winds, and the length of the journey were the most prominent factors in his illness.

=== Initial production ===
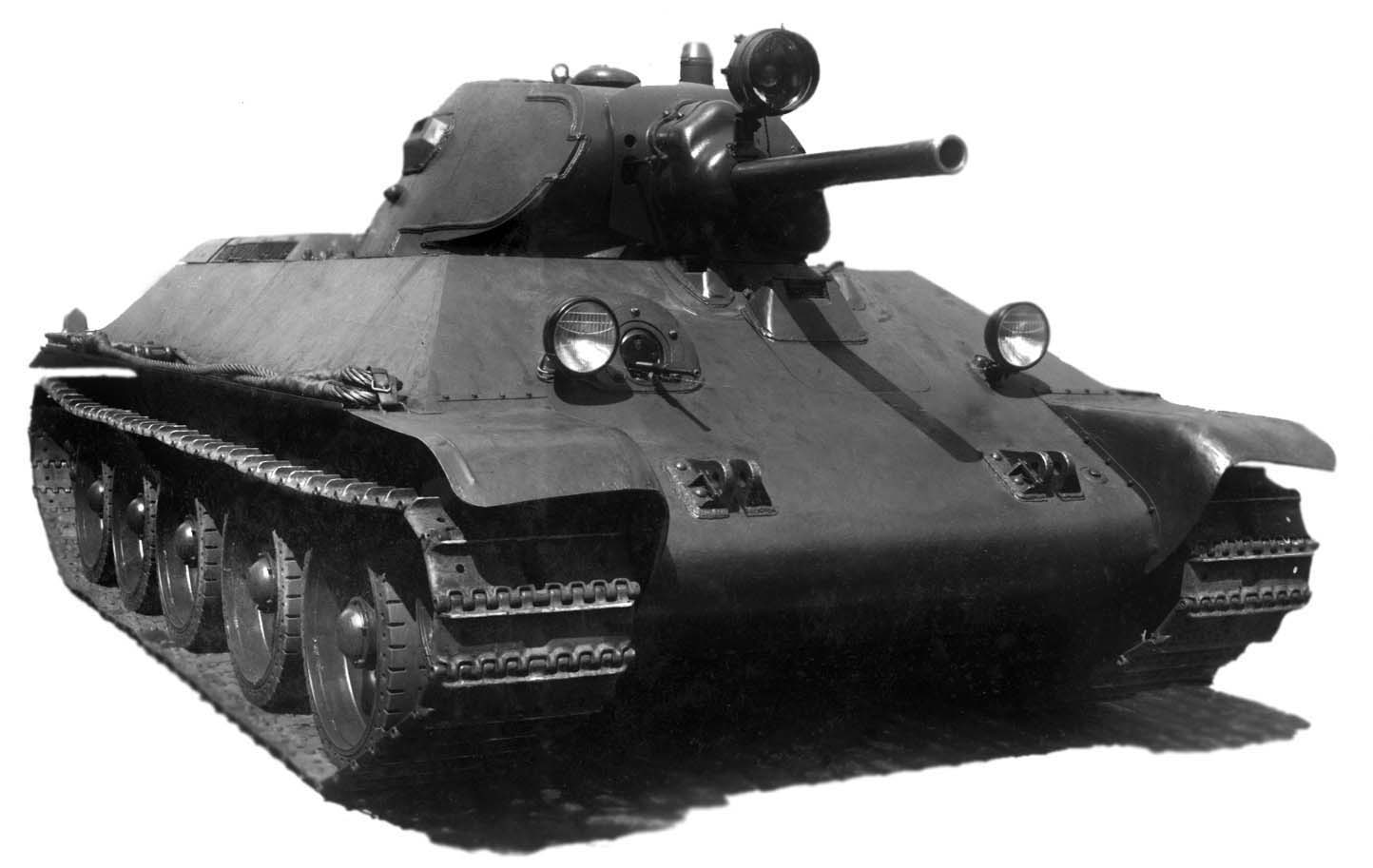
Pre-production prototype A-34 with a complex single-piece hull front

Resistance from the military command and concerns about high production cost were finally overcome by anxieties about the poor performance of Soviet tanks in the Winter War in Finland, and the effectiveness of German tanks during the Battle of France. The first production T-34s were completed in September 1940, completely replacing the production of the T-26, the BT series and the multi-turreted T-28 medium tank at the KhPZ plant. Koshkin died of pneumonia (exacerbated by the drive from Kharkiv to Moscow) at the end of that month, and the T-34's drivetrain developer, Alexander Morozov, was appointed Chief Designer.

The T-34 posed new challenges for the Soviet industry. It had heavier armour than any medium tank produced to date, and there were problems with defective armour plates. Only company commanders' tanks could be fitted with radios (originally the 71-TK-3 radio set), due to their expense and short supply – the rest of the tank crews in each company signalled with flags. The L-11 gun did not live up to expectations, so the Grabin Design Bureau at Gorky Factory N.92 designed the superior 76.2 mm F-34 gun. (Note: see designations of Soviet artillery for explanation of naming convention) No bureaucrat would approve production of the new gun, but Gorky and KhPZ started producing it anyway; official permission came from the State Defense Committee only after troops praised the weapon's performance in combat against the Germans.

Production of this first T-34 series – the Model 1940 – totalled only about 400, before production was switched to the Model 1941, with the F-34 gun, 9-RS radio set (also installed on the SU-100), and even thicker armour.

=== Mass production ===
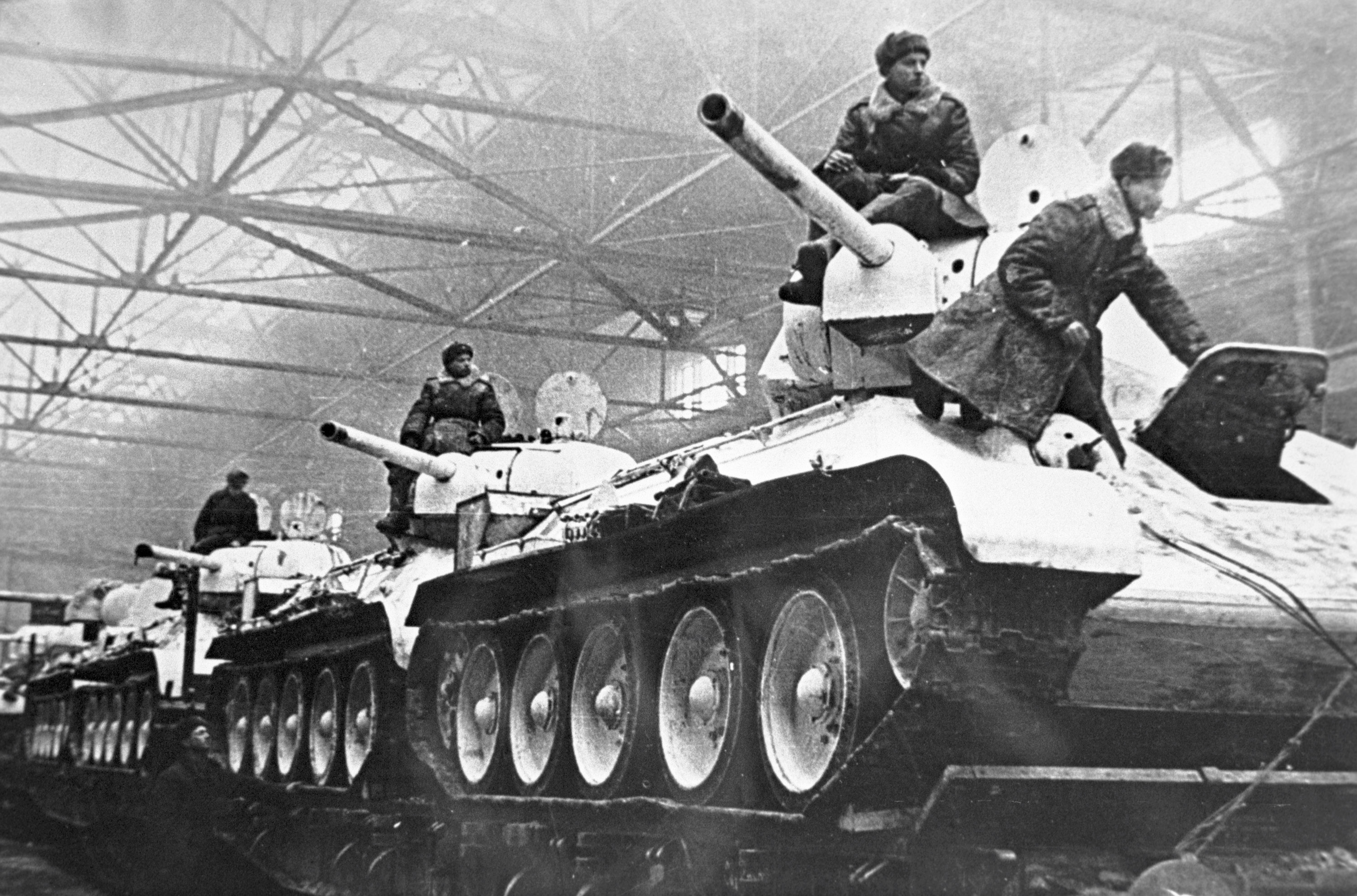
T-34 tanks headed to the front.

Subassemblies for the T-34 originated at several plants: Kharkiv Diesel Factory N.75 supplied the model V-2-34 engine, Leningrad Kirovsky Factory (formerly the Putilov works) made the original L-11 gun, and the Dinamo Factory in Moscow produced electrical components. Tanks were initially built at Plant N.183, in early 1941 at the Stalingrad Tractor Factory (STZ), and starting in July at Krasnoye Sormovo Factory N.112 in Gorky. (Note: Due to a shortage of new Model V-2-34 diesel engines and a need to produce as many T-34s as possible, the initial production run from the Gorky factory were equipped with the BT tank's Mikulin M-17 petrol aircraft engine, and inferior transmission and clutch.)

Total Soviet tank production
Type	Number
Light tanks	14,508
T-34	35,119
T-34-85	29,430
KV and KV-85	4,581
IS	3,854
SU-76	12,671
SU-85	2,050
SU-100	1,675
SU-122	1,148
SU-152	4,779

After Germany's surprise invasion of the Soviet Union on 22 June 1941 (Operation Barbarossa), the Wehrmacht's rapid advances forced the evacuation and relocation of Soviet tank factories eastwards to the Ural Mountains, an undertaking of immense scale and haste that presented enormous logistic difficulties and was extremely punishing to the workers involved. Alexander Morozov personally supervised the evacuation of all skilled engineers and labourers, machinery and stock from KhPZ to re-establish the factory at the site of the Dzerzhinsky Ural Railcar Factory in Nizhny Tagil, renamed Stalin Ural Tank Factory N.183. The Kirovsky Factory, evacuated just weeks before the Germans surrounded Leningrad, moved with the Kharkiv Diesel Factory to the Stalin Tractor Factory in Chelyabinsk, soon to be nicknamed Tankograd ("Tank City"). The workers and machinery from Leningrad's Voroshilov Tank Factory N.174 were incorporated into the Ural Factory and the new Omsk Factory N.174. The Ordzhonikidze Ural Heavy Machine Tool Works (UZTM) in Sverdlovsk absorbed workers and machines from several small machine shops in the path of German forces.

While these factories were being rapidly moved, the industrial complex surrounding the Dzerzhinsky Tractor Factory in Stalingrad continued to work double shifts throughout the period of withdrawal (September 1941 to September 1942) to make up for production lost, and produced 40% of all T-34s during the period. As the factory became surrounded by heavy fighting in the Battle of Stalingrad in 1942, the situation there grew desperate: manufacturing innovations were necessitated by material shortages, and stories persist of unpainted T-34 tanks driven out of the factory directly to the battlefields around it. Stalingrad kept up production until September 1942.

Soviet designers were aware of design deficiencies in the tank, but most of the desired remedies would have slowed tank production and so were not implemented: the only changes allowed on the production lines through to 1944 were those to make production simpler and cheaper. New methods were developed for automated welding and hardening the armour plate, including innovations by Prof. Evgeny Paton. The design of the 76.2 mm F-34 gun Model 1941 was reduced from an initial 861 parts to 614. The initial narrow, cramped turrets, both the cast one and the one welded of rolled armour plates bent to shape, were since 1942 gradually replaced with the somewhat less cramped hexagonal one; as it was mostly cast with only a few, simple flat armour plates welded in (roof etc.), this turret was faster to produce. Limited rubber supplies led to the adoption of all-steel, internally sprung road wheels, and a new clutch was added to an improved five-speed transmission and engine, improving reliability.

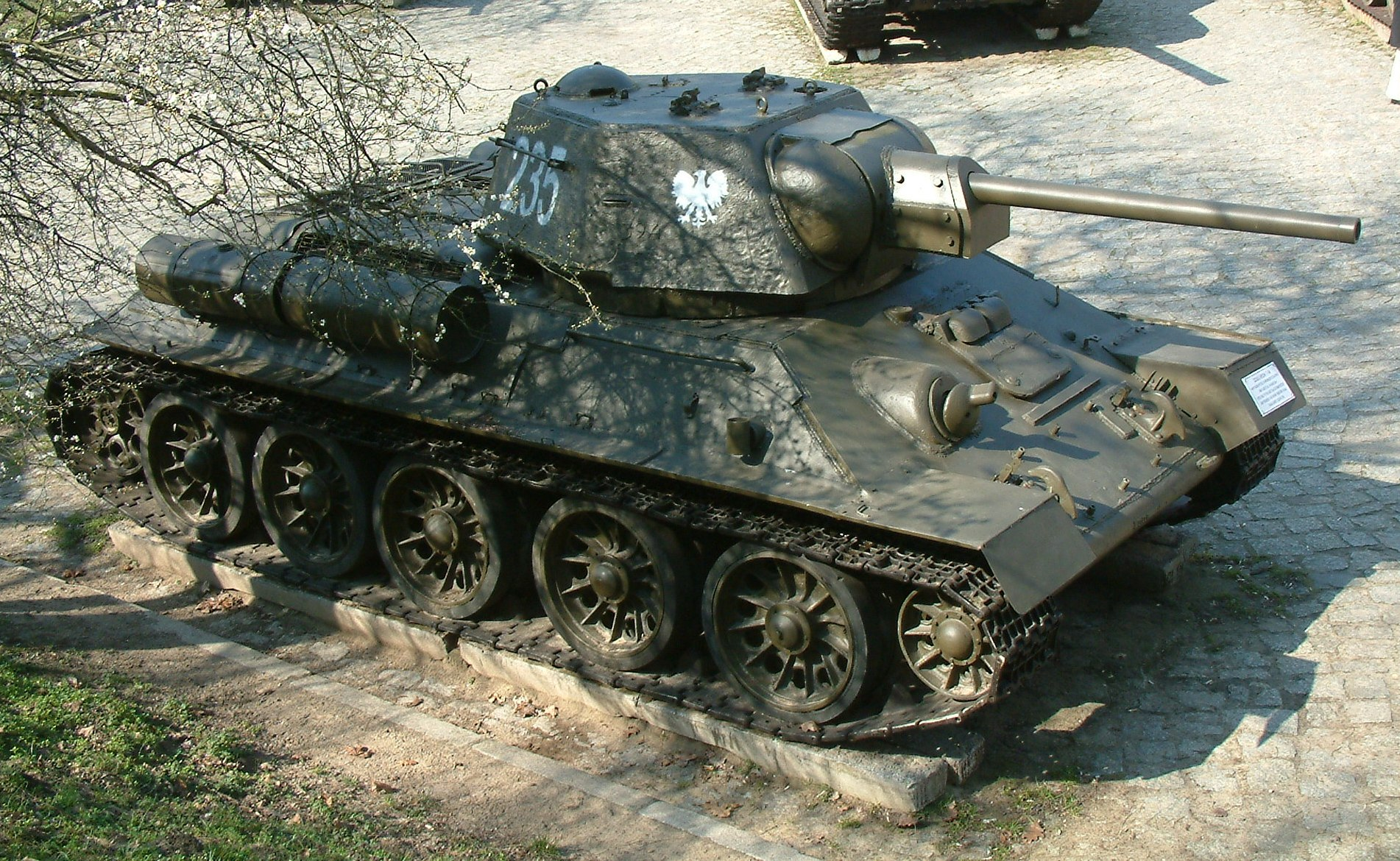
Polish T-34 Model 1942 in Poznań, Poland. The model 1942's hexagonal turret distinguishes it from earlier models.

Over two years, the unit production cost of the T-34 was reduced from 269,500 Rbls in 1941, to 193,000 Rbls, and then to 135,000 Rbls.

In 1943, T-34 production had reached an average of 1,300 per month; this was the equivalent of three full-strength tank divisions. By the end of 1945, over 57,300 T-34s had been built: 34,780 T-34 tanks in multiple variants with 76.2 mm guns in 1940–44, and another 22,609 of the revised T-34-85 model in 1944–45. The single largest producer was Factory N.183 (UTZ), building 28,952 T-34s and T-34-85s from 1941 to 1945. The second-largest was Krasnoye Sormovo Factory N.112 in Gorky, with 12,604 in the same period.

At the start of the German-Soviet war, T-34s comprised about four percent of the Soviet tank arsenal, but by the end it made up at least 55% of tank production (based on figures from Zaloga; Zheltov lists even larger numbers.

Following the end of the war, a further 2,701 T-34s were built prior to the end of Soviet production. Under licence, production was restarted in Poland (1951–55) and Czechoslovakia (1951–58), where 1,380 and 3,185 T-34-85s were made, respectively, by 1956. Altogether, as many as 84,070 T-34s are thought to have been built, plus 13,170 self-propelled guns built on T-34 chassis. It was the most-produced tank of the Second World War, and the second most-produced tank of all time, after its successor, the T-54/55 series.

== Design ==
=== Overview ===
The T-34 had well-sloped armour, a relatively powerful engine and wide tracks. The initial T-34 version had a powerful 76.2 mm gun, and is often called the T-34/76 (originally a World War II German designation, never used by the Red Army). In 1944, a second major version began production, the T-34-85, with a larger 85 mm gun intended to deal with newer German tanks.

Comparisons can be drawn between the T-34 and the U.S. M4 Sherman tank. Both tanks were the backbone of the armoured units in their respective armies, both nations distributed these tanks to their allies, who also used them as the mainstay of their own armoured formations, and both were upgraded extensively and fitted with more powerful guns. Both were designed for mobility and ease of manufacture and maintenance, sacrificing some performance for these goals. Both chassis were used as the foundation for a variety of support vehicles, such as armour recovery vehicles, tank destroyers, and self-propelled artillery. Both were an approximately even match for the standard German medium tank, the Panzer IV, though each of these three tanks had particular advantages and weaknesses compared with the other two. Neither the T-34 nor the M4 was a match for Germany's heavier tanks, the Panther (technically a medium tank) or the Tiger I; the Soviets used the IS-2 heavy tank and the U.S. used the M26 Pershing as the heavy tanks of their forces instead.

Soviet medium tank models of World War II
Model	T-34 Model 1940	T-34 Model 1941	T-34 Model 1942	T-34 Model 1943	T-43 prototype	T-34-85	T-44
Weight	26 t (29 tons)	26.5 t (29.2 tons)	28.5 t (31.4 tons)	30.9 t (34.1 tons)	34 t (37 tons)	32 t (35 tons)	31.9 t (35.2 tons)
Gun	76.2 mm L-11	76.2 mm F-34	76.2 mm F-34	76.2 mm F-34	76.2 mm F-34	85 mm ZiS-S-53	85 mm ZiS-S-53
Ammunition	76 rounds	77 rounds	77 rounds	100 rounds		60 rounds	58 rounds
Fuel (internal)	460 L (100 imp gal; 120 US gal)		460–610 L (100–130 imp gal; 120–160 US gal) 610 L with additional fuel tanks	460–790 L (100–170 imp gal; 120–210 US gal) 790 L with additional fuel tanks		556–935 L (122–206 imp gal; 147–247 US gal) 935 L with additional fuel tanks	500–642 L (110–141 imp gal; 132–170 US gal) 642 L with additional fuel tanks
Road range	330 km (210 mi)			330–450 km (210–280 mi)	240 km (150 mi)	300–485 km (186–301 mi)	240–300 km (150–190 mi)
Cross-country range	200 km (120 mi)			200–260 km (120–160 mi)	180 km (110 mi)	160–310 km (99–193 mi)	150–210 km (93–130 mi)
Armour	15–45 mm (0.59–1.77 in)	20–45 mm (0.79–1.77 in)	20–65 mm (0.79–2.56 in)	20–70 mm (0.79–2.76 in)	16–90 mm (0.63–3.54 in)	20–90 mm (0.79–3.54 in)	15–120 mm (0.59–4.72 in)
Cost		270,000 Rbls	193,000 Rbls	135,000 Rbls		164,000 Rbls	

Dimensions, road speed and engine horsepower of the various models did not vary significantly, except for the T-43, which was slower than the T-34.

=== Armour ===
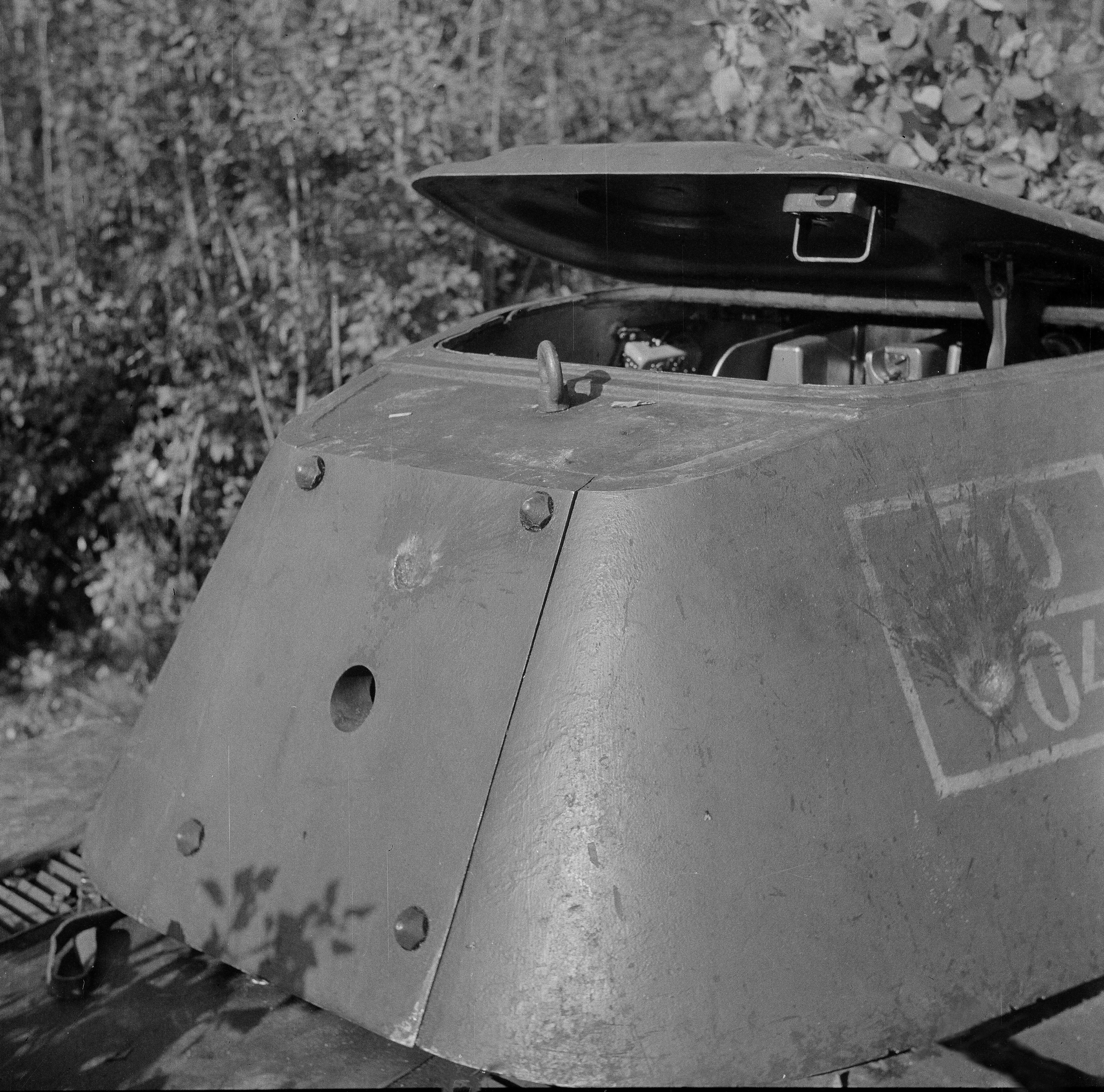
Non-penetrating hits to the turret armour of an early variant T-34

The heavily sloped armour design made the tank better protected than the armour thickness alone would indicate. The shape also saved weight by reducing the thickness required to achieve equal protection. A few tanks also had appliqué armour of varying thickness welded onto the hull and turret. Tanks thus modified were called s ekranami (Russian: с экранами, "with screens").

The USSR donated two combat-used Model 1941 T-34s to the United States for testing purposes in late 1942. The examinations, performed at the Aberdeen Proving Ground, revealed problems with overall armour build quality, especially of the plate joins and welds, as well as the use of soft steel combined with shallow surface tempering. Leak issues were noted: "In a heavy rain lots of water flows through chinks/cracks, which leads to the disabling of the electrical equipment and even the ammunition". Earlier models of the T-34, until the Model 1942, had cast turrets whose armour was softer than that of the other parts of the tank, and offered poor resistance even to 37 mm anti-aircraft shells. Early T-34s also suffered from poor quality welds, leading to instances of shells which would not have penetrated the tank under normal circumstances to penetrate anyway. They also suffered from rushed manufacturing, leading to inconsistent protection.

In addition, close examination of the T-34 at the Aberdeen Testing Ground showed that a variety of alloys were used in different portions of the armour on the T-34. "Mn-Si-Mo steels were employed for the thinner rolled armour sections, Cr-Mo steels for the thicker rolled armour sections, Mn-Si-Ni-Cr-Mo steels were employed for both rolled and cast steel components from 2" to 5" in thickness, and Ni-Cr-Mo steels were employed for some of the moderately thick cast armour sections". The armour was heat-treated in order to prevent penetration by armour-piercing shells, but this also caused it to be structurally weak, as the armour was very hard and thus brittle, resulting in strikes by high explosive shells causing spalling.

Despite these deficiencies, the T-34's armour proved problematic for the Germans in the initial stages of the war on the Eastern Front. In one wartime account, a single T-34 came under heavy fire upon encountering one of the most common German anti-tank guns at that stage of the war: "Remarkably enough, one determined 37 mm gun crew reported firing 23 times against a single T-34 tank, only managing to jam the tank's turret ring." Similarly, a German report of May 1942 noted the ineffectiveness of their 50 mm gun as well, noting that "Combating the T-34 with the 5 cm KwK tank gun is possible only at short ranges from the flank or rear, where it is important to achieve a hit as perpendicular to the surface as possible." However, a Military Commissariat Report of the 10th Tank Division, dated 2 August 1941 reported that within 300–400 m the 37 mm Pak 36's armour-piercing shot could defeat the frontal armour. According to an examination of damaged T-34 tanks in several repair workshops in August to September 1942, collected by the People's Commissariat for Tank Industry in January 1943, 54.3% of all T-34 losses were caused by the German long-barrelled 5 cm KwK 39 gun.

As the war went on, the T-34 gradually lost some of its initial advantages. The Germans responded to the T-34 by fielding large numbers of improved anti-tank weapons such as the towed 7.5 cm Pak 40 anti-tank gun, while hits from 88 mm-armed Tigers, anti-aircraft guns and 8.8 cm Pak 43 anti-tank guns usually proved lethal. In 1942 the German Panzer IVs were refitted with the 7.5 cm KwK 40 due to the inadequate anti-tank performance of previous German tank designs against the T-34. The upgunned Panzer IV posed a serious threat to the T-34-76, being able to penetrate the frontal turret of a T-34-76 at a range of 1,200 m (3,900 ft) at any angle.

A Wa Pruef 1 report estimated that, with the target angled 30° sideward, a Panther tank could penetrate the turret of a T-34-85 from the front at ranges up to 2000 m, the mantlet at 1200 m, and the frontal hull armour at 300 m. According to the Pantherfibel (the Panther tank manual for its crew), the T-34's glacis could be penetrated from 800 m and the mantlet from 1500 m at 30° sideward angle.

A Waffenamt-Prüfwesen 1 report estimated that with the T-34 angled 30 degrees sidewards and APCBC round, the Tiger I's 8.8 cm KwK 36 L/56 would have to close in to 100 m (110 yd) to achieve a penetration in the T-34's glacis, and could penetrate the frontal turret of a T-34-85 at 1,400 m, the mantlet at 400 m, and the nose at 300 m. Ground trials by employees of NIBT Polygon in May 1943 reported that the 88 mm KwK 36 gun could pierce the T-34 frontal hull from 1,500 meters at 90 degrees and cause a disastrous burst effect inside the tank. The examined hull showed cracks, spalling, and delamination due to the poor quality of the armour. It was recommended to increase and improve the quality of welds and armour.

Analysis of destroyed T-34 tanks in the Korean War found that the 76 and 90 mm armour-piercing rounds of the M41 Walker Bulldog and M46 Patton could penetrate the T-34 at most angles from 800 yd (730 m). The maximum range at which the tanks could penetrate the T-34 could not be determined due to a lack of data at higher combat ranges.

In late 1950 a T-34-85 tank was captured by UN forces in the Korean War. An evaluation of the tank was conducted by the US which found that the sloped armour of the T-34 was desirable for deflecting shells. They also concluded that the armour was deemed as satisfactory as armour strength was comparable to US armour of similar hardness and that the quality of the material used was "high-grade". Similarly, casting was seen as high quality although casting defects were found in the side armour of the tank that negatively affected armour strength. The abundance of gaps in the joints of the armour was seen as an undesirable feature of the tank due to the risk of injury from "entry of bullet splash and shell fragments".

=== Firepower ===
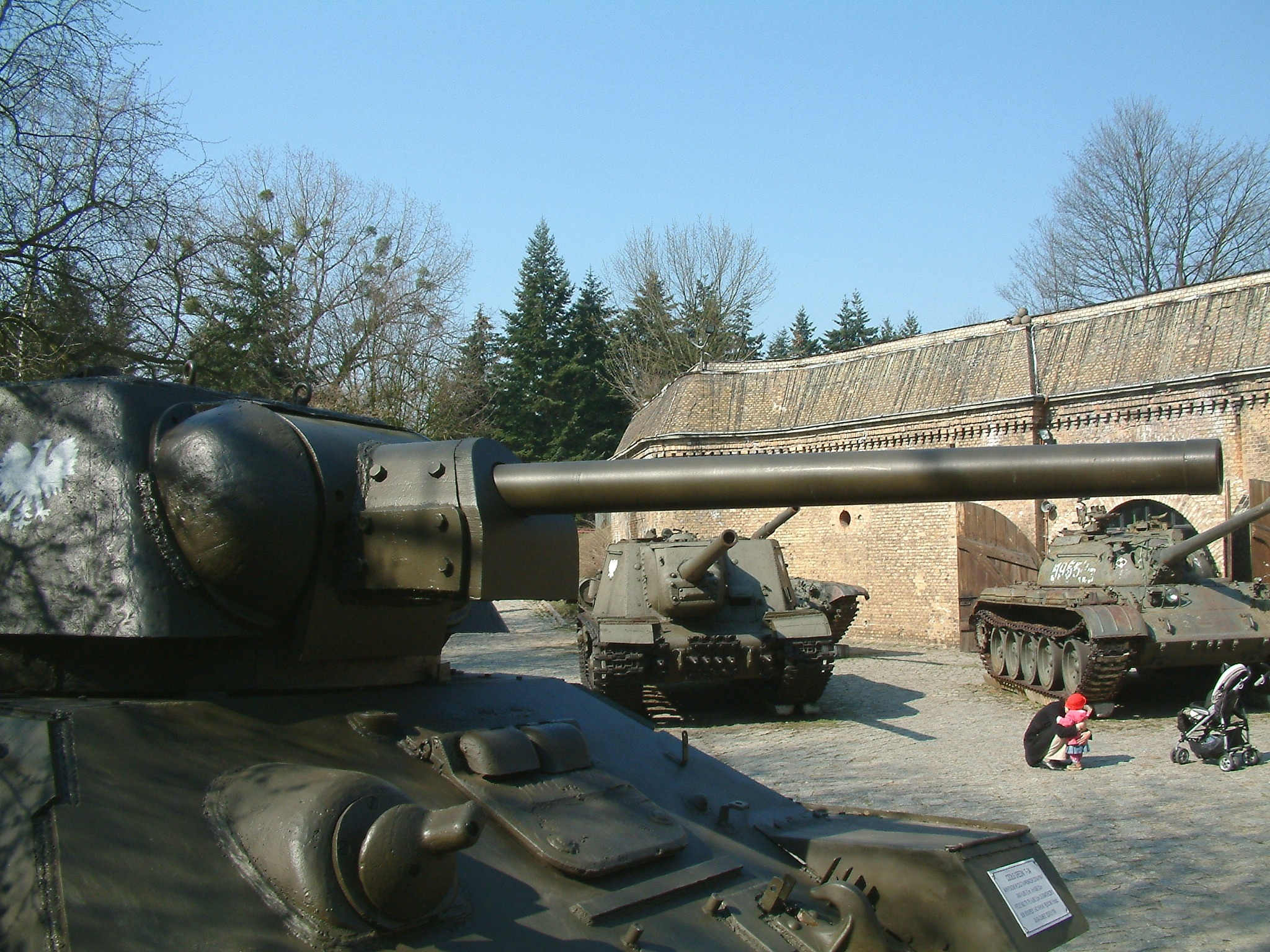
T-34 side view, displaying the F-34 gun, with an ISU-122 and T-54 in background

The 76.2 mm (3.00 in) F-34 gun, fitted on the vast majority of T-34s produced through to the beginning of 1944, was able to penetrate any early German tank's armour at normal combat ranges. When firing APCR shells, it could pierce 92 mm (3.6 in) at 500 m (1,600 ft) and 60 mm (2.4 in) of armour at 1,000 m (3,300 ft) The best German tanks of 1941, the Panzer III and Panzer IV, had no more than 50 or 60 mm (2.0 or 2.4 in) of flat frontal armour. However by 1942 the Germans had increased the hull armour on the Panzer IV to 80 mm (3.1 in) which provided good protection at normal combat distances. The F-34 also fired an adequate high explosive round.

The gun sights and range finding for the F-34 main gun (either the TMFD-7 or the PT4-7) were rather crude, especially compared to those of their German adversaries, affecting accuracy and the ability to engage at long ranges. The weak optics and poor vision devices, coupled with the T-34's two-man turret (see below), meant that the T-34 was very slow to find and engage targets, while German Panzer III and IV tanks could typically get off three rounds for every one fired by the T-34.

As the war progressed the Germans created heavier tank designs like the Tiger I or Panther which were both immune to the 76mm gun of the T-34 when fired upon from the front. This meant that they could only be penetrated from the sides at ranges of a few hundred metres. Due to low anti-tank performance, the T-34 was upgraded to the T-34-85 model. This model, with its 85 mm (3.35 in) ZiS gun, provided greatly increased firepower compared to the previous T-34's 76.2mm gun. The 85 mm gun could penetrate the turret front of a Tiger I tank from 500 m (550 yd) and the driver's front plate from 300 m (330 yd) at the side angle of 30 degrees, and the larger turret enabled the addition of another crew member, allowing the roles of commander and gunner to be separated and increasing the rate of fire and overall effectiveness. The D-5T was capable of penetrating the Tiger I's upper hull armour at 1,000 metres. When firing on the frontal armour of the Panther at an angle of 30 degrees sidewards, the T-34-85 could not penetrate its turret at 500 m (550 yd). This meant that the T-34 would have to resort to using tungsten rounds or firing on the weaker sides of the Panther to destroy it.

The greater length of the 85 mm gun barrel – 4.645 m (15 ft 2.9 in) – made it necessary for crews to be careful not to plough it into the ground on bumpy roads or in combat. Tank commander A.K. Rodkin commented: "the tank could have dug the ground with it in the smallest ditch [filling the barrel with dirt]. If you fired it after that, the barrel would open up at the end like the petals of a flower", destroying the barrel. Standard practice when moving the T-34-85 cross-country in non-combat situations was to fully elevate the gun, or reverse the turret.

During the Korean War, the USA captured a T-34-85. US engineering analysis and testing concluded that the T-34-85 could penetrate 4.1 in (100 mm) at 1,000 yd (910 m), performing similarly to the HVAP rounds of the M41. The Americans also concluded the maximum range of the gun was 2–3 km (1.2–1.9 mi), but the effective range was only up to 1,900 m (1.2 mi).

=== Mobility ===
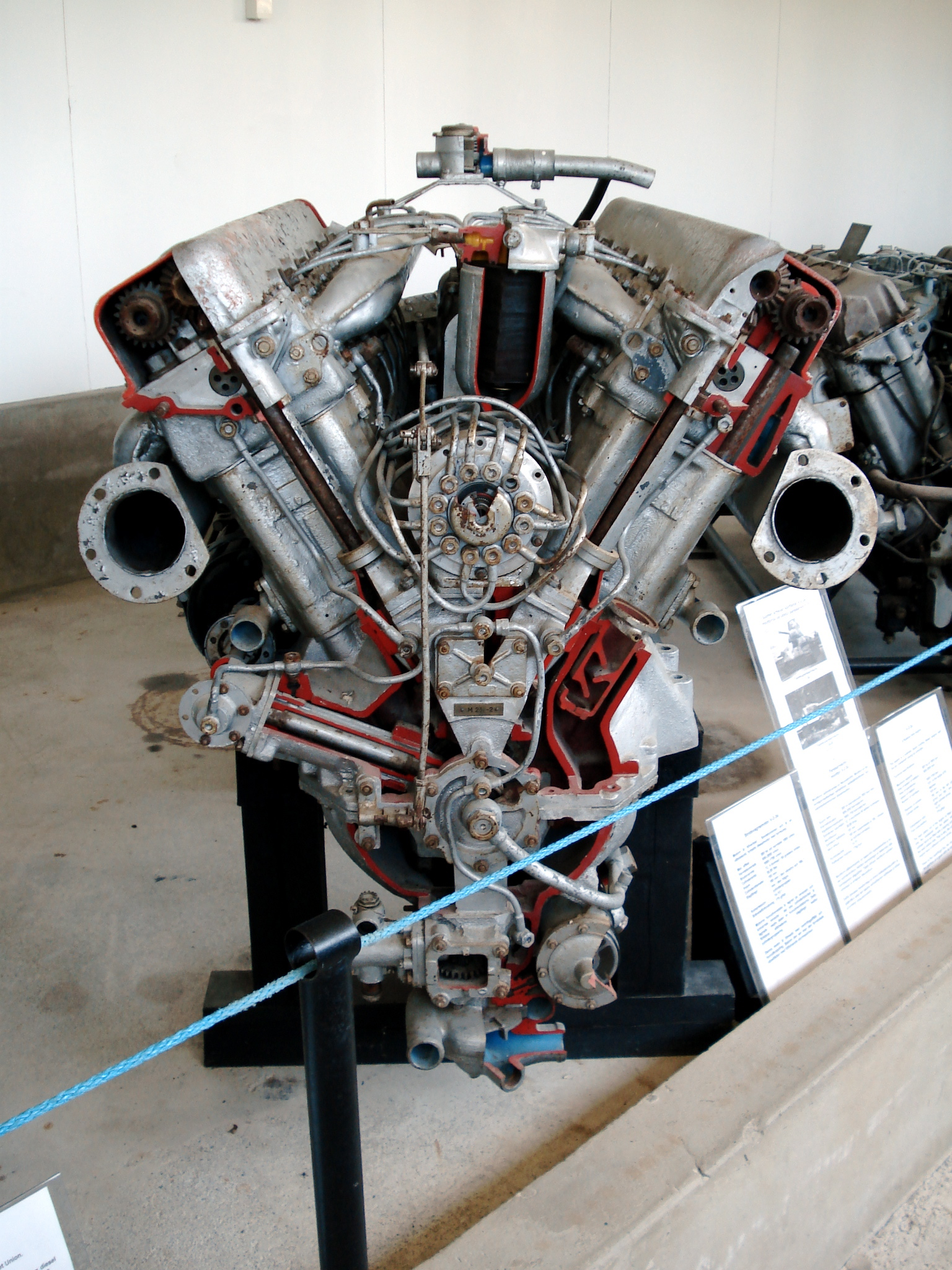
The T-34's 12-cylinder Model V-2-34 diesel engine at the Finnish Tank Museum in Parola

The T-34 was powered by a Model V-2-34 38.8 L V12 Diesel engine of 500 hp (370 kW), (Note: The name of the T-34's engine (V-2; B-2 in Russian) is a model name, and has nothing to do with its number of cylinders.) giving a top speed of 53 km/h (33 mph). It used the coil-spring Christie suspension of the earlier BT-series tanks, using a "slack track" tread system with a rear-mounted drive sprocket and no system of return rollers for the upper run of track, but dispensed with the heavy and ineffective convertible drive. T-34 tanks equipped with the 4-speed gearbox could only use 4th gear on road, being limited to 3rd on terrain. In the first batch of T-34s, shifting from 2nd to 3rd required a force of 46-112 kg. In September 1941, however, changes were made which lowered the effort to under 31 kg by changing the 3rd gear ratio, which lowered top speed in 3rd gear from 29 km/h to 25 km/h, but made shifting easier. Using the 5-speed gearbox allowed the T-34 to use 4th gear on terrain, with which it could reach 30 km/h.

The T-34-76's ground pressure was around 0.72 kg/cm². Its wide tracks allowed for superior performance on dirt roads and off-road when compared to contemporary tanks. There were, however, still examples of T-34s getting stuck in mud. For example, on February 4th, 1944, the 21st Guards Tank Brigade, equipped with 32 T-34's, was ordered to proceed by road to Tolstoye Rogi, a journey of approximately 80 kilometers. Of the 32 tanks, no less than 19 got stuck in the mud or suffered mechanical breakdowns.

=== Ergonomics ===
The original 76mm armed T-34 suffered from the unsatisfactory ergonomic layout of its crew compartment compared to the later 85mm variant. The two-man turret crew arrangement required the commander to aim and fire the gun, an arrangement common to most Soviet tanks of the day. The two-man turret was "cramped and inefficient" and was inferior to the three-man (commander, gunner, and loader) turret crews of German Panzer III and Panzer IV tanks. The Germans noted the T-34 was very slow to find and engage targets while the Panzers could typically get off three rounds for every one fired by the T-34. As a result of the T-34's two-man turret, weak optics and poor vision devices, the Germans noted:

T-34s operated in a disorganized fashion with little coordination or else tended to clump together like a hen with its chicks. Individual tank commanders lacked situational awareness due to the poor provision of vision devices and preoccupation with gunnery duties. A tank platoon would seldom be capable of engaging three separate targets but would tend to focus on a single target selected by the platoon leader. As a result, T-34 platoons lost the greater firepower of three independently operating tanks.

Early in the war, the commander fought at a further disadvantage; the forward-opening hatch and the lack of a turret cupola forced him to observe the battlefield through a single vision slit and traversable periscope. German commanders liked to fight "heads-up", with their seat raised and having a full field of view — in the T-34 this was impossible. Soviet veterans condemned the turret hatches of the early models. Nicknamed pirozhok ("stuffed bun") because of its characteristic shape, it was heavy and hard to open. The complaints of the crews urged the design group led by Alexander Morozov to switch in August 1942 to using two hatches in the turret.

The loader also had a difficult job due to the lack of a turret basket (a rotating floor that moves as the turret turns); the same fault was present on all German tanks prior to the Panzer IV. The floor under the T-34's turret was made up of ammunition stored in small metal boxes, covered by a rubber mat. There were nine ready rounds of ammunition stowed in racks on the sides of the fighting compartment. Once these rounds had been used, the crew had to pull additional ammunition out of the floor boxes, leaving the floor littered with open bins and matting and reducing their performance.

The main weakness [of the two-man turret of a T-34 Model 1941] is that it is very tight. The Americans couldn't understand how our tankers could fit inside during a winter when they wear sheepskin jackets. The electrical mechanism for rotating the turret is very bad. The motor is weak, very overloaded and sparks horribly, as a result of which the device regulating the speed of the rotation burns out, and the teeth of the cogwheels break into pieces. They recommend replacing it with a hydraulic or simply manual system. Due to not having a turret basket the crew was [sic] could be injured by getting caught in the drive mechanism, this could leave them out of combat for a while, the lack of a turret basket also caused general discomfort to the crew, having to manually turn.

Most of the problems created by the cramped T-34/76 turret, known before the war, were corrected with the provision of a bigger cast three-man turret on the T-34-85 in 1944.

=== General reliability ===
The T-34's wide track and good suspension gave it excellent cross-country performance. Early in the tank's life, however, this advantage was greatly reduced by the numerous teething troubles the design displayed: a long road trip could be a lethal exercise for a T-34 tank at the start of the war. When in June 1941, the 8th Mechanised Corps under Dmitry Ryabyshev marched 500 km towards Dubno, the corps lost half of its vehicles. A.V. Bodnar, who was in combat in 1941–42, recalled:

From the point of view of operating them, the German armoured machines were almost perfect, they broke down less often. For the Germans, covering 200 km was nothing, but with T-34s something would have been lost, something would have broken down. The technological equipment of their machines was better, the combat gear was worse.

The T-34 gearbox had four forward and one reverse gear, replaced by a five-speed box on the last of the 1943 model of the T-34.

The tracks of early models were the most frequently repaired part. A.V. Maryevski later remembered:

The caterpillars used to break apart even without a bullet or shell hits. When earth got stuck between the road wheels, the caterpillar, especially during a turn – strained to such an extent that the pins and tracks themselves couldn't hold out.

The USSR donated two combat-used Model 1941 T-34s to the United States for testing purposes in late 1942. The examinations, performed at the Aberdeen Proving Ground, highlighted these early faults, which were in turn acknowledged in a 1942 Soviet report on the results of the testing:

The Christie's suspension was tested a long time ago by the Americans and unconditionally rejected. On our tanks, as a result of the poor steel on the springs, it very quickly fatigues and as a result clearance is noticeably reduced. The deficiencies in our tracks from their viewpoint result from the lightness of their construction. They can easily be damaged by small-caliber and mortar rounds. The pins are extremely poorly tempered and made of poor steel. As a result, they quickly wear and the track often breaks.

Testing at Aberdeen also revealed that engines could grind to a halt from dust and sand ingestion, as the original "Pomon" air filter was almost totally ineffective and had an insufficient air-inflow capacity, starving the combustion chambers of oxygen, lowering compression, and thereby restricting the engine from operating at full capacity. At the time of the Aberdeen testing, the alleged air filter issue was already remedied by the addition of "Cyclone" filters on the Model 1943, and even more efficient "Multi-Cyclone" filters on the T-34-85.

The testing at Aberdeen revealed other problems as well. The turret drive also suffered from poor reliability. The use of poorly machined, low quality steel side friction clutches and the T-34's outdated and poorly manufactured transmission meant frequent mechanical failure occurred and that they "create an inhuman harshness for the driver". A lack of properly installed and shielded radios – if they existed at all – restricted their operational range to under 16 km (9.9 mi).

Judging by samples, Russians when producing tanks pay little attention to careful machining or the finishing and technology of small parts and components, which leads to the loss of the advantage what would otherwise accrue from what on the whole are well-designed tanks. Despite the advantages of the use of diesel, the good contours of the tanks, thick armor, good and reliable armaments, the successful design of the tracks etc., Russian tanks are significantly inferior to American tanks in their simplicity of driving, manoeuvrability, the strength of firing (reference to muzzle velocity), speed, the reliability of mechanical construction and the ease of keeping them running.

Soviet tests on newly built T-34s showed that in April 1943 only 10.1% could complete a 330 km trial and in June '43 this went down to 7.7%. The percentage stayed below 50% till October 1943 when it rose to 78%, in the next month it dropped to 57% and in the period December '43 – January '44 the average was 82%. During February 1944 tests, 79% of tanks reached 300 kilometers, and of the test batches 33% reached 1,000 kilometers. This became immediately apparent to the tank troops. The deputy commander of the 1st Guards Tank Army, P. G. Dyner, commented that tanks in 1943 would reach only 75 percent of their guaranteed life span in engine hours and mileage, but in 1944 they reached 150 percent.

Percentage of T-34 tanks reaching 330 kilometers during factory trials
1943									1944	
Apr	May	Jun	Jul	Aug	Sep	Oct	Nov	Dec	Jan	Feb
10.1	23.0	7.7	28.6	43.0	46.0	78.0	57.0	83.6	83.4	79.0

In 1944 June, a report written by the 2. Panzerjäger-Abteilung Company 128 (23. PzDiv.) described experiences acquired during operations with its Beutepanzer SU-85 and T-34:

Despite not having much experience yet, it can be said that the Russian battle tank is not suitable for carrying out long marches as well as high-speed marches. A maximum driving speed of 10–12 km / h has become convenient. During the marches and in order to allow the engines to cool down, it is absolutely necessary to make a stop every half hour for a minimum duration of between fifteen and twenty minutes.

Steering gears have caused problems and breakdowns on all new battle tanks. In difficult terrain, during the gears or also during the course of attacks where many changes of direction are made, the steering clutch heats up and covers with oil quickly: consequently the clutch does not engage and it is impossible to maneuver the vehicle. Once it has cooled down, the clutch should be cleaned with copious amounts of fuel.

In relation to the armament and based on the experiences acquired so far, it can be affirmed that the power of the 7.62 cm cannon is good. If the barrel is adjusted correctly it has good precision even at great distances. The same can be said of the rest of the automatic weapons of the battle tank. The weapons have good precision and reliability, although a slow rate of fire.

The Company has had the same positive experiences with the 8.5 cm assault gun. Regarding the true power of fire compared to the 7.62 cm gun, the Company is not yet able to give details. The effect of explosive projectiles ( Sprenggranaten ) at great distances and its precision is much higher than that of the 7.62 cm cannon.

The optical systems of the Russian battle tank are, in comparison with the Germans, much inferior. The German gunner has to get used to the Russian telescopic sight. Observing the impact or the trajectory of the projectile through the telescopic sight is only partially possible. The gunner of the Russian T-43 [sic] battle tank has only a panoramic optic, located in the upper left area, in front of the telescopic sight. In order for the loader to be able to observe the trajectory of the projectile in any case, the Company has additionally incorporated a second panoramic optics for this member of the crew.

In the Russian tank it is very difficult to steer the vehicle or a unit and shoot simultaneously. Coordinating fire within a company is only partially possible.

On 29 January 1945, the State Defense Committee approved a decree that extended the service life guarantee of the T-34's V-2-34 engine from 200 hours to 250 hours. A report by the 2nd Guards Tank Army in February 1945 revealed that the average engine service life of a T-34 was lower than the official warranty at 185–190 hours. For comparison, the US M4 Sherman had an average engine service life of 195–205 hours.

== Operational history ==
=== Operation Barbarossa (1941) ===
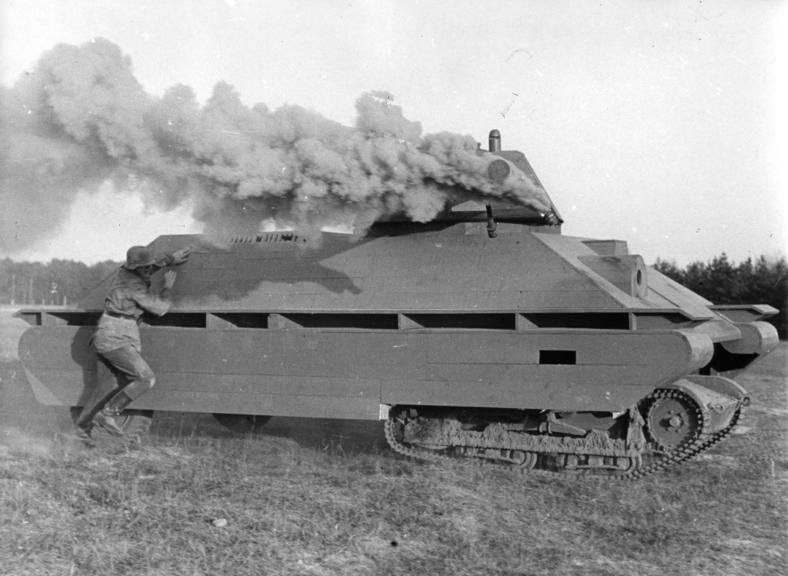
German training mockup of a T-34 built over a captured Polish TK-3 tankette

Germany launched Operation Barbarossa, its invasion of the Soviet Union, on 22 June 1941. At the start of hostilities, the Red Army had 967 T-34 tanks and 508 KV tanks concentrated in five of their twenty-nine mechanized corps. The existence of the T-34 and KV heavy tanks proved a psychological shock to German soldiers, who had expected to face an inferior enemy. The T-34 was superior to any tank the Germans then had in service. The diary of Alfred Jodl seems to express surprise at the appearance of the T-34 in Riga, noting "the surprise at this new and thus unknown wunder-armament being unleashed against the German assault divisions". Paul Ludwig Ewald von Kleist, called it "the finest tank in the world" and Heinz Guderian affirmed the T-34's "vast superiority" over German tanks.

Initially, the Wehrmacht had great difficulty destroying T-34s in combat, as standard German anti-tank weaponry proved ineffective against its heavy, sloped armour. The inability to penetrate the T-34's armour led to the Germans' standard anti-tank gun, the 37 mm PaK 36, being dubbed the Panzeranklopfgerät (lit. "tank doorknocking apparatus") because the PaK 36 crew simply revealed their presence and wasted their shells without damaging the T-34's armour. Anti-tank gunners began aiming at tank tracks, or vulnerable margins on the turret ring and gun mantlet, rather than the bow and turret armour. The Germans were forced to deploy 105 mm field guns and 88 mm anti-aircraft guns in a direct fire role to stop them. In one of the first known encounters, a T-34 crushed a 3.7 cm PaK 36, destroyed two Panzer IIs, and left a 14-kilometre (8.7 mi) long swathe of destruction in its wake before a howitzer destroyed it at close range. In another incident, a single Soviet T-34 was hit more than 30 times by a battalion-sized contingent of German 37mm and 50mm anti-tank guns, yet survived intact and drove back to its own lines a few hours later.

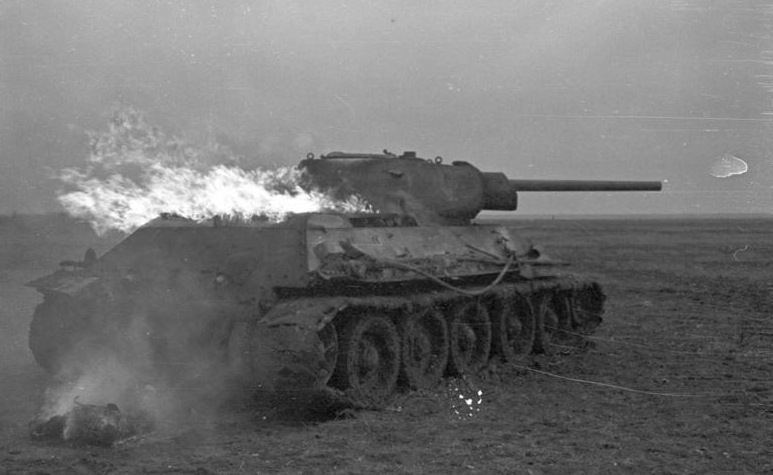
Burning T-34, Soviet Union, 1941

Despite the T-34's superior attributes over its German counterparts, the Soviet corps equipped with these new tanks lost most of them within weeks. The combat statistics for 1941 show that the Soviets lost an average of over seven tanks for every German tank lost. The Soviets lost a total of 20,500 tanks in 1941 (approximately 2,300 of them T-34s, as well as over 900 heavy tanks, mostly KVs). The destruction of the Soviet tank force was accomplished not only by the glaring disparity in the tactical and operational skills of the opponents, but also by mechanical defects that afflicted Soviet armour. Besides the poor state of older tanks, the new T-34s and KVs suffered from initial mechanical and design problems, particularly with regard to clutches and transmissions. Mechanical breakdowns accounted for at least 50 percent of the tank losses in the summer fighting, and recovery or repair equipment was not to be found. The shortage of repair equipment and recovery vehicles led the early T-34 crews to enter combat carrying a spare transmission on the engine deck.

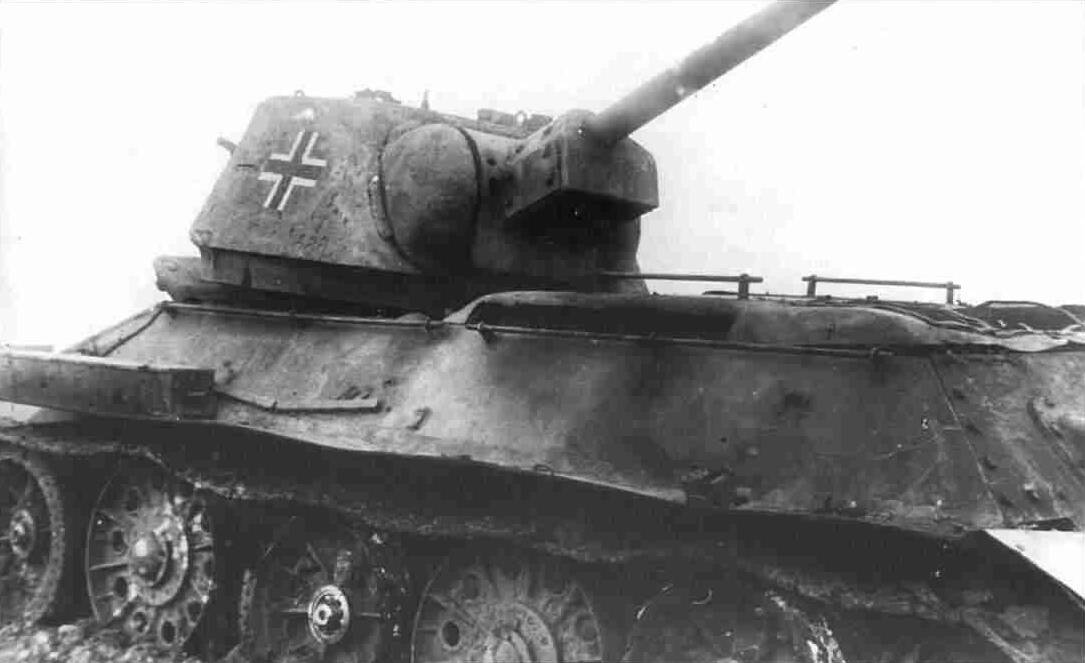
T-34 being used by the Wehrmacht

Other key factors diminishing the initial impact of T-34s on the battlefield was their weak optics and poor vision devices, coupled with the initial two-man turret which was extremely cramped, making them very slow to find and engage targets, and denying them situational awareness. The poor state of leadership, tank tactics, and crew training, as well as an initial lack of radios in tanks, was partially a consequence of Stalin's purge of the Soviet officer corps in 1937, reducing the army's efficiency and morale. This was aggravated as the campaign progressed by the loss of many of the properly trained personnel during the Red Army's disastrous defeats early in the invasion. Typical crews went into combat with only basic military training plus 72 hours of classroom instruction; according to historian Steven Zaloga:

The weakness of mechanized corps lay not in the design of their equipment, but rather in its poor mechanical state, the inadequate training of their crews, and the abysmal quality of Soviet military leadership in the first month of the war.

=== Further action (1942–1943) ===
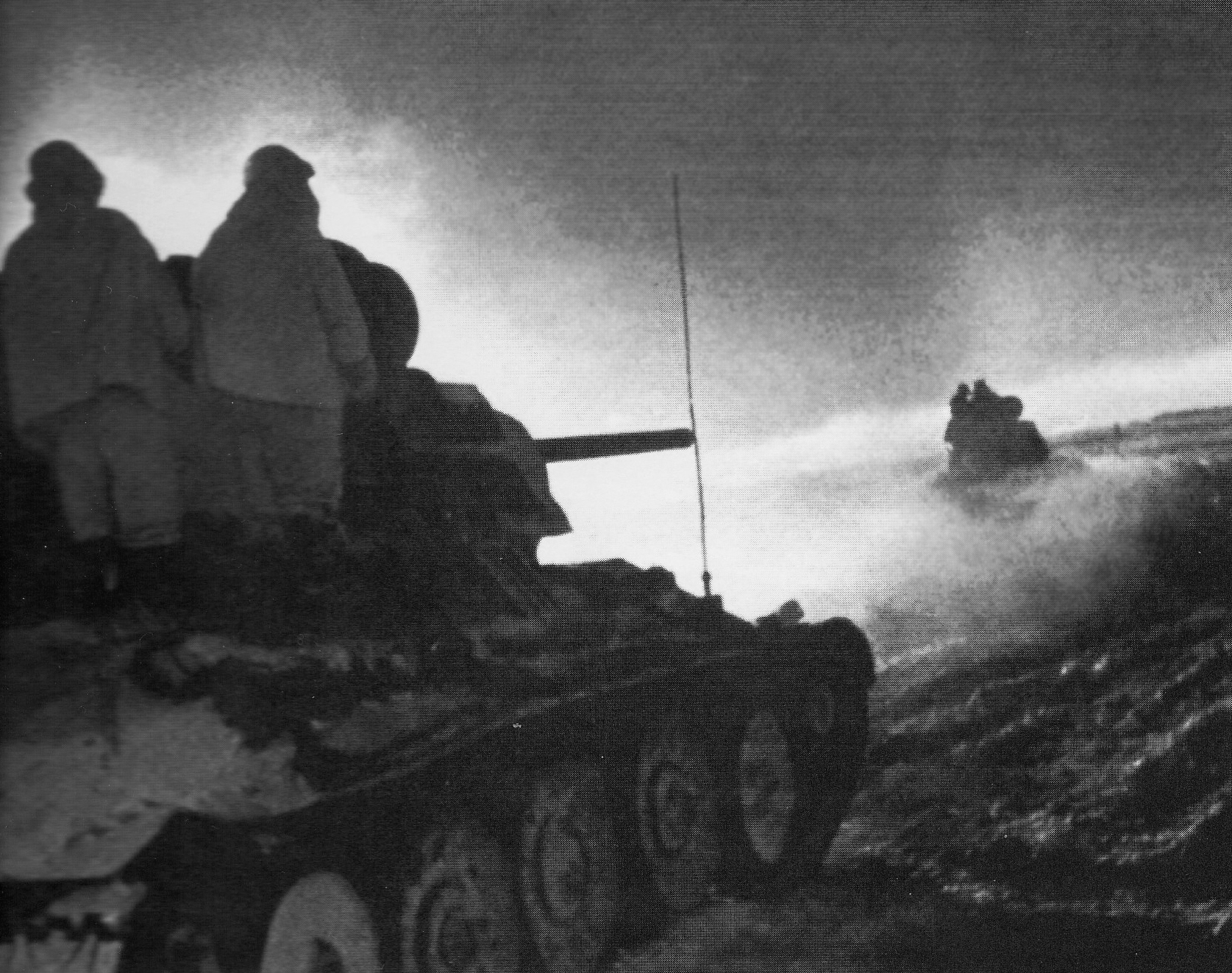
Soviet T-34 tanks during the Operation Little Saturn in December 1942

As the invasion progressed, German infantry began receiving increasing numbers of the 7.5 cm Pak 40 anti-tank guns, which were capable of penetrating the T-34's armour at long range. Larger numbers of the 88 mm Flak guns also arrived, which could easily defeat a T-34 at very long ranges, though their size and general unwieldiness meant that they were often difficult to move into position in the rough Soviet terrain.

At the same time, the Soviets incrementally upgraded the T-34. The Model 1942 featured increased armour on the turret and many simplified components. The Model 1943 (confusingly also introduced in 1942) had yet more armour, as well as increased fuel capacity and more ammunition storage. Also added were an improved engine air filter and a new clutch mated to an improved and more reliable five-speed transmission. Finally, the Model 1943 also had a new, slightly roomier (but still two-man) turret of a distinctive hexagonal shape that was easier to manufacture, derived from the abandoned T-34M project.

The T-34 was essential in resisting the German summer offensive in 1942. In Operation Uranus, the T-34s spearheaded the double encirclement manoeuvre that cut off the German Sixth Army at Stalingrad. The Germans, while experienced in fighting the T-34 by this time, had nonetheless transferred several mechanized divisions from the Soviet Union to Western Europe, and only relied upon the XXXXVIII Panzer Corps, which had the strength of a single panzer division, and the 29th Panzergrenadier Division as reserves to bolster their Romanian allies guarding the German Sixth Army's flanks. The Romanian 3rd and 4th armies lacked sufficient anti-tank equipment that could stop the T-34. The Sixth Army was surrounded in late November 1942, and eventually surrendered in February 1943, a campaign widely regarded as the turning point of the war on the Eastern Front.

In 1943, the Soviets formed Polish and Czechoslovak armies-in-exile, and these started to receive the T-34 Model 1943 with a hexagonal turret. Like the Soviet forces themselves, the Polish and Czechoslovak tank crews were sent into action quickly with little training, and suffered high casualties.

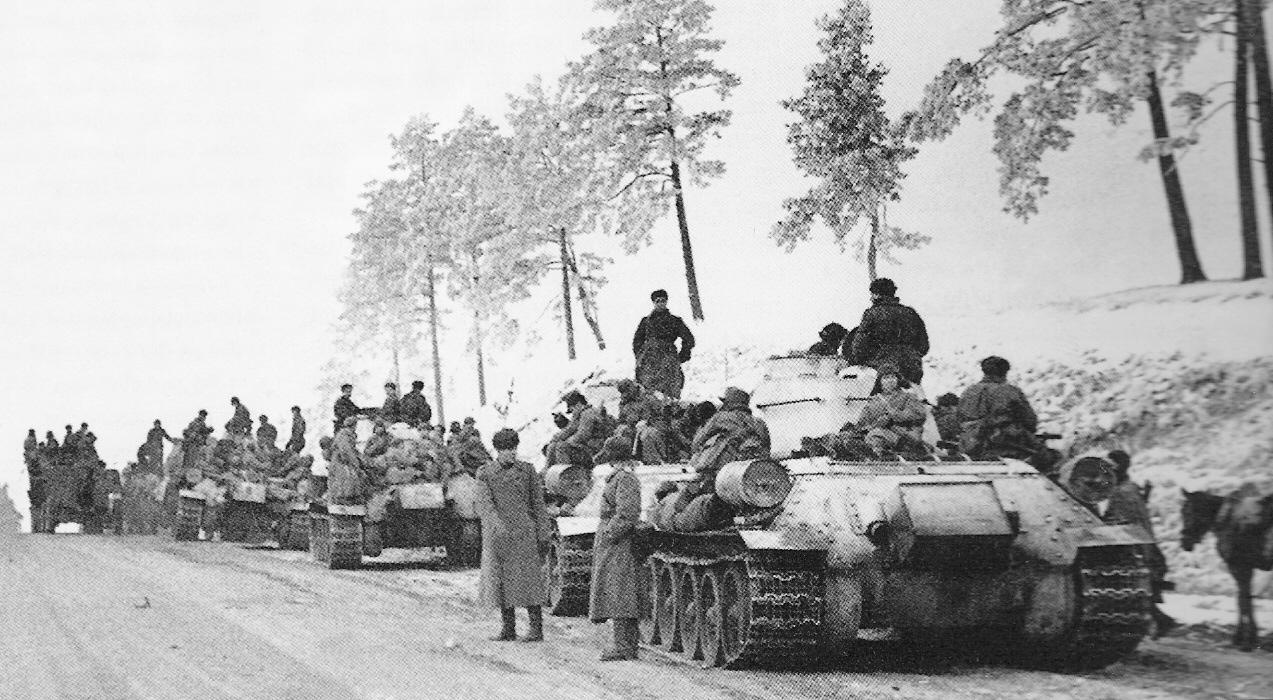
Soviet T-34 tanks await orders to move forward during the Zhitomir–Berdichev Offensive in January 1944

In July 1943, the Germans launched Operation Citadel, in the region around Kursk, their last major offensive on the Eastern Front in the Second World War. It was the debut of the German Panther tank, although the numbers employed at the resulting Battle of Kursk were small and the brunt of the burden was carried by the Panzer III, StuG III, and Panzer IV. The campaign featured the largest tank battles in history. The high-water mark of the battle was the massive armour engagement at Prokhorovka, which began on 12 July, though the vast majority of armour losses on both sides were caused by artillery and mines, rather than tanks. Over 6,000 fully tracked armoured vehicles, 4,000 combat aircraft, and 2 million men are believed to have participated in these battles.

The Soviet high command's decision to focus on one cost-effective design, cutting costs and simplifying production wherever possible while only allowing relatively minor improvements, had proven to be an astute choice for the first two years of the war. However, the battles in the summer of 1943 demonstrated that the 76.2 mm gun of the T-34 was no longer as effective as it was in 1941. Soviet tank crews struggled at longer ranges with the additional frontal armour applied to the later variants of the Panzer III and Panzer IV, and were unable to penetrate the frontal armour of the new German Panther or Tiger I tank at standard combat ranges without tungsten rounds, and had to rely on tactical skill through flanking manoeuvres and combined arms.

=== T-34-85 ===
A T-34 Model 1942 (left), next to the T-43

After improved German Panzer IVs with the high-velocity 7.5cm (2.95 in) KwK 40 gun were encountered in combat in 1942, a project to design an entirely new Soviet tank was begun, with the goals of increasing armour protection while adding modern features like a torsion-bar suspension and a three-man turret. The new tank, the T-43, was intended to be a universal model to replace both the T-34 and the KV-1 heavy tank. However, the T-43 prototype's armour, though heavier, was not capable against German 88 mm guns, while its mobility was found to be inferior to the T-34. Finally, although the T-43 shared over 70% of its components with the T-34, manufacturing it would still have required a significant slow-down in production. Consequently, the T-43 was cancelled.

The Germans improved not only the weaponry of their tanks, but their armour as well. Soviet firing tests against a captured Tiger I heavy tank in April 1943 showed that the T-34's 76 mm gun could not penetrate the front of the Tiger I at all, and the side only at very close range. A Soviet 85 mm anti-aircraft gun, the M1939 (52-K), was found capable of doing the job, and so derivatives of it were developed for tanks. One of the resulting guns used on the original T-34 85 model (the D-5T) was capable of penetrating the Tiger I's upper hull armour at 1,000 metres. It was still not enough to match the Tiger, which could destroy the T-34 from a distance of 1,500 to 2,000 m (4,900 to 6,600 ft), but it was a noticeable improvement.

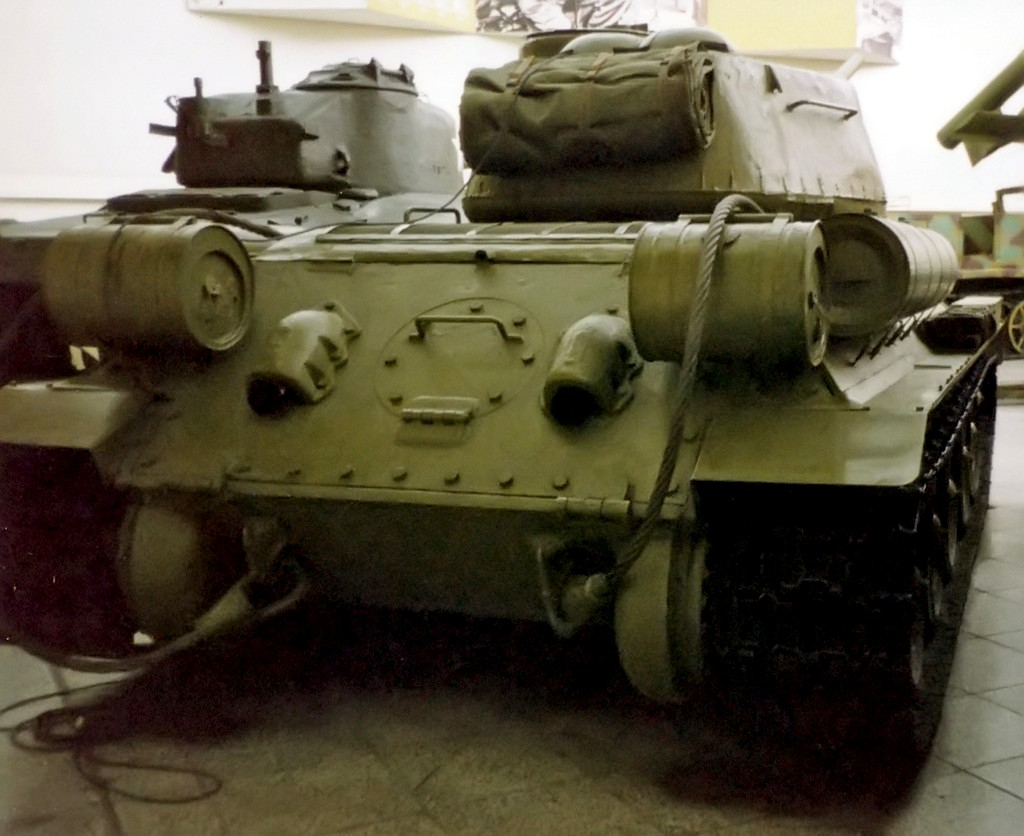
Rear view of a T-34-85 from Factory 174. In the center is a circular transmission access hatch, flanked by exhaust pipes, MDSh smoke canisters on the hull rear, and extra fuel tanks on the hull sides.

With the T-43 cancelled, the Soviet command made the decision to retool the factories to produce an improved version of the T-34. Its turret ring was enlarged from 1,425 mm (56 in) to 1,600 mm (63 in), allowing a larger turret to be fitted supporting the larger 85 mm gun. The prototype T-43's turret design was hurriedly adopted by Vyacheslav Kerichev at the Krasnoye Sormovo Factory to fit the T-34. This was a larger three-man turret, with radio (previously in the hull) and observation cupola in the roof. Now the tank commander needed only to command (aided by cupola and radio systems), leaving the operation of the gun to the gunner and the loader. The turret was bigger and less sloped than the original T-34 turret, making it a bigger target (due to the three-man crew and bigger gun), but with thicker 90 mm armour, making it more resistant to enemy fire. The shells were 50% heavier (9 kg) and were much better in the anti-armour role, and reasonable in a general purpose role, though only 55–60 could be carried, instead of 90–100 of the earlier shells. The resulting new tank, the T-34-85, was seen as a compromise between advocates for the T-43 and others who wanted to continue to build as many 76 mm-armed T-34s as possible without interruption.

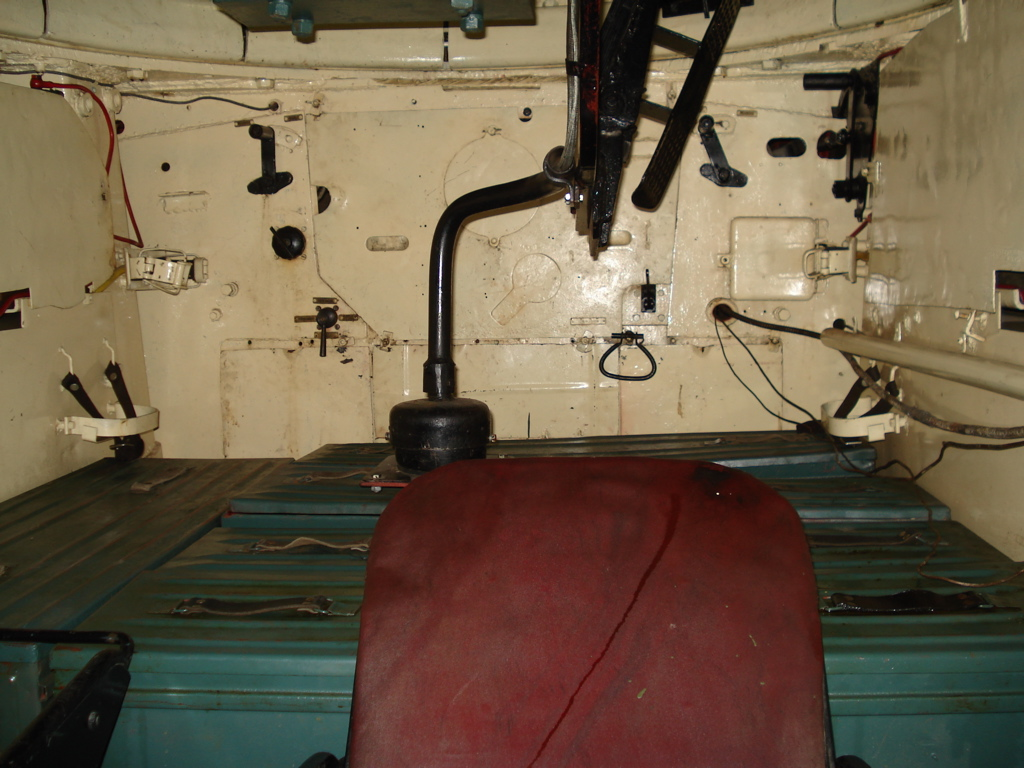
Interior of a T-34-85 viewed from the driver's hatch, showing the ammunition boxes on which the loader had to stand in the absence of a turret basket. In the foreground is the driver's seat. Levers for radiator flaps can be seen on the firewall.

Production of the T-34-85 began in January 1944 at Factory No. 112, first using the D-5T 85 mm gun. Parallel to the production of the T-34-85 with the D-5T gun, production of the T-34-85 using the S-53 gun (later to be modified and redesignated as the ZIS-S-53 gun) began in February 1944 at Factory No. 112. The improved T-34-85 became the standard Soviet medium tank, with an uninterrupted production run until the end of the war. A T-34-85 initially cost about 30 percent more to produce than a Model 1943, at 164,000 Rbls; by 1945 this had been reduced to 142,000 Rbls during the course of World War II the cost of a T-34 tank had almost halved, from 270,000 Rbls in 1941, while its top speed remained about the same, and its main gun's armour penetration and turret frontal armour thickness both nearly doubled.

The T-34-85 gave the Red Army a tank with better armour and mobility than the German Panzer IV tank and StuG III assault gun. While it could not match the armour or weapons of the heavier Panther and Tiger tanks, its improved firepower made it much more effective than earlier models, and overall it was more cost-effective than the heaviest German tanks. In comparison with the T-34-85 program, the Germans instead chose an upgrade path based on the introduction of completely new, expensive, heavier, and more complex tanks, greatly slowing the growth of their tank production and helping the Soviets to maintain a substantial numerical superiority in tanks. By May 1944, T-34-85 production had reached 1,200 tanks per month. In the entire war, production figures for all Panther types reached no more than 6,557, and for all Tiger types (including the Tiger I and Tiger II) 2,027. Production figures for the T-34-85 alone reached 22,559.

On 12 January 1945, a column of Tiger IIs and other tanks from 424th Heavy Panzer Battalion were involved in a short-range engagement with T-34-85 tanks near the village of Lisow. Forty T-34-85 tanks commanded by Colonel N. Zhukov were attacked by the 424th Heavy Panzer battalion, which had been reinforced by 13 Panthers. The Germans permanently lost five Tiger IIs, seven Tiger Is and five Panthers for the loss of four T-34-85 tanks burnt out.

=== German use of T-34s ===
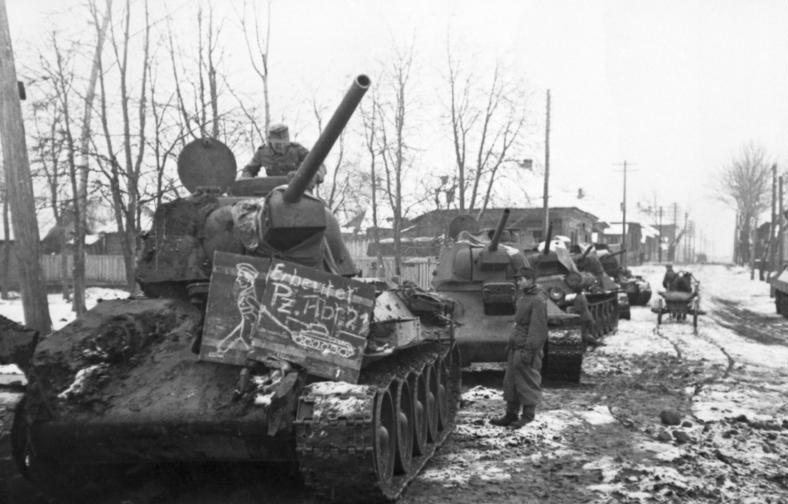
Captured T-34 Model 1943 tanks pressed into service with the Wehrmacht, January 1944

The German army often employed as much captured materiel as possible and T-34s were not an exception. Large numbers of T-34s were captured in fighting on the Eastern Front though few were T-34-85s. These were designated by the Germans as Panzerkampfwagen T-34 747(r). From late 1941, captured T-34s were transported to a German workshop for repairs and modification to German requirements. In 1943 a local tank factory in Kharkiv was used for this purpose. These were sometimes modified to German standards by the installation of a German commander's cupola and radio equipment.

The first captured T-34s entered German service during the summer of 1941. In order to prevent recognition mistakes, large-dimension crosses or even swastikas were painted on the tanks, including on top of the turret, in order to prevent attack by Axis aircraft. Badly damaged tanks were either dug in as pillboxes or were used for testing and training purposes.

After the end of World War II, East Germany's newly-organized tank regiments utilized the T-34 into the 1950s.

=== Manchurian campaign (August 1945) ===
Just after midnight on 9 August 1945, though the terrain was believed by the Japanese to be impassable by armoured formations, the Soviet Union invaded Japanese-occupied Manchuria. Red Army combined-arms forces achieved complete surprise and used a powerful, deep-penetrating attack in a classic double encirclement pattern, spearheaded by the T-34-85. The opposing Japanese forces had been reduced as elite units had been drawn off to other fronts and the remaining forces were in the middle of a redeployment. The Japanese tanks remaining to face them were all held in the rear and not used in combat; the Japanese had weak support from IJAAF forces, engineering, and communications. Japanese forces were overwhelmed, though some put up resistance. The Japanese emperor transmitted a surrender order on 14 August, but the Kwantung Army was not given a formal cease-fire until 17 August.

=== Korean War (1950–1953) ===
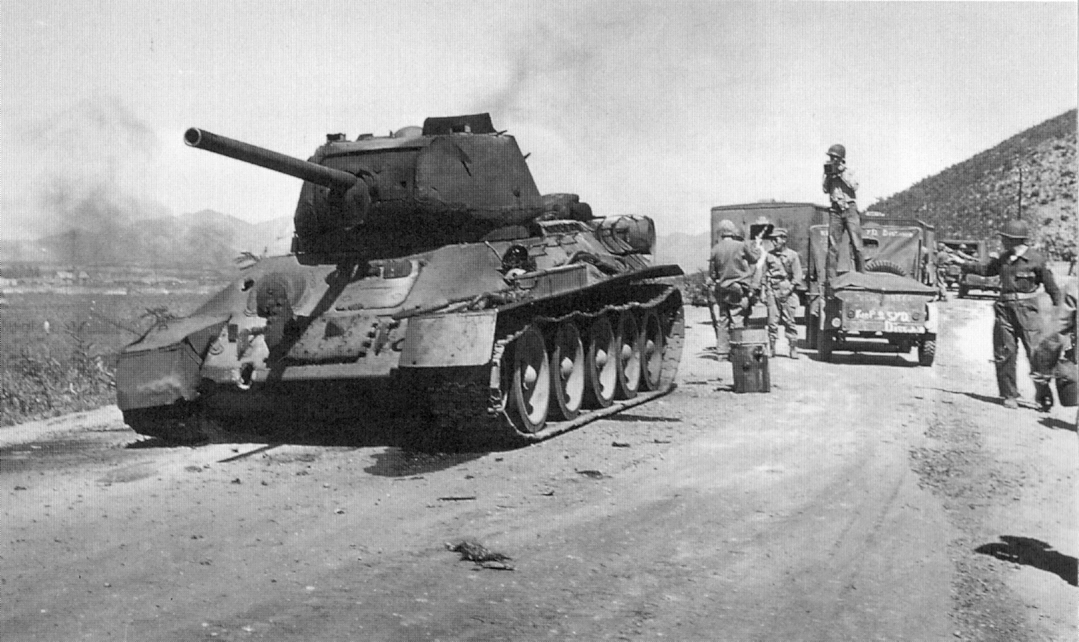
US Marines knocked out this North Korean T-34-85 in September 1950 while US and United Nations forces advanced on Seoul after their successful amphibious landings at Inchon during the Korean War. At least two penetrating hits can be seen on the tank's front.

A full North Korean People's Army (KPA) brigade equipped with about 120 Soviet-supplied T-34-85s spearheaded the invasion of South Korea in June 1950. The WWII-era 2.36-inch bazookas initially used by the US troops in South Korea were useless against the KPA's T-34 tanks, as were the 75 mm main guns of the M24 Chaffee light tank. However, following the introduction of heavier and more capable armour into the war by US and UN forces, such as the American M4 Sherman, M26 Pershing and M46 Patton tanks, as well as the British Comet and Centurion tanks, the KPA began to suffer more T-34 tank losses in combat from enemy armour, aside from further losses due to numerous US/UN airstrikes and increasingly-effective anti-tank firepower for US/UN infantry on the ground, such as the then-new 3.5-inch M20 "Super Bazooka" (replacing the earlier 2.36-inch model). By the time the NKPA were forced to withdraw from the south, about 239 T-34s and 74 SU-76 assault guns had been lost or abandoned. After October 1950, NKPA armour was rarely encountered. Despite China's entry into the conflict in the following month, no major armour deployments were carried out by them, as the Chinese focus was on massed infantry attacks rather than large-scale armour assaults. Several T-34-85s and a few IS-2 tanks were fielded, primarily dispersed amongst their infantry, thus making armoured engagements with US and UN forces rare from then on.

A Chinese T-34 tank No. 215 from 4th Tank Regiment, 2nd Tank Division, allegedly destroyed four enemy tanks and damaged another M46 Patton tank during its fight from 6 to 8 July 1953. It also destroyed 26 bunkers,9 artillery pieces, and a truck. That tank is now preserved in the Military Museum of the Chinese People's Revolution.

In summary, a 1954 US military survey concluded that there were, in all, 119 tanks vs. tank actions involving US Army and US Marine units against North Korean and Chinese forces during the Korean War, with 97 T-34-85 tanks knocked out and another 18 considered probable. American losses were somewhat greater.

=== Angolan Civil War (1975–1988) ===
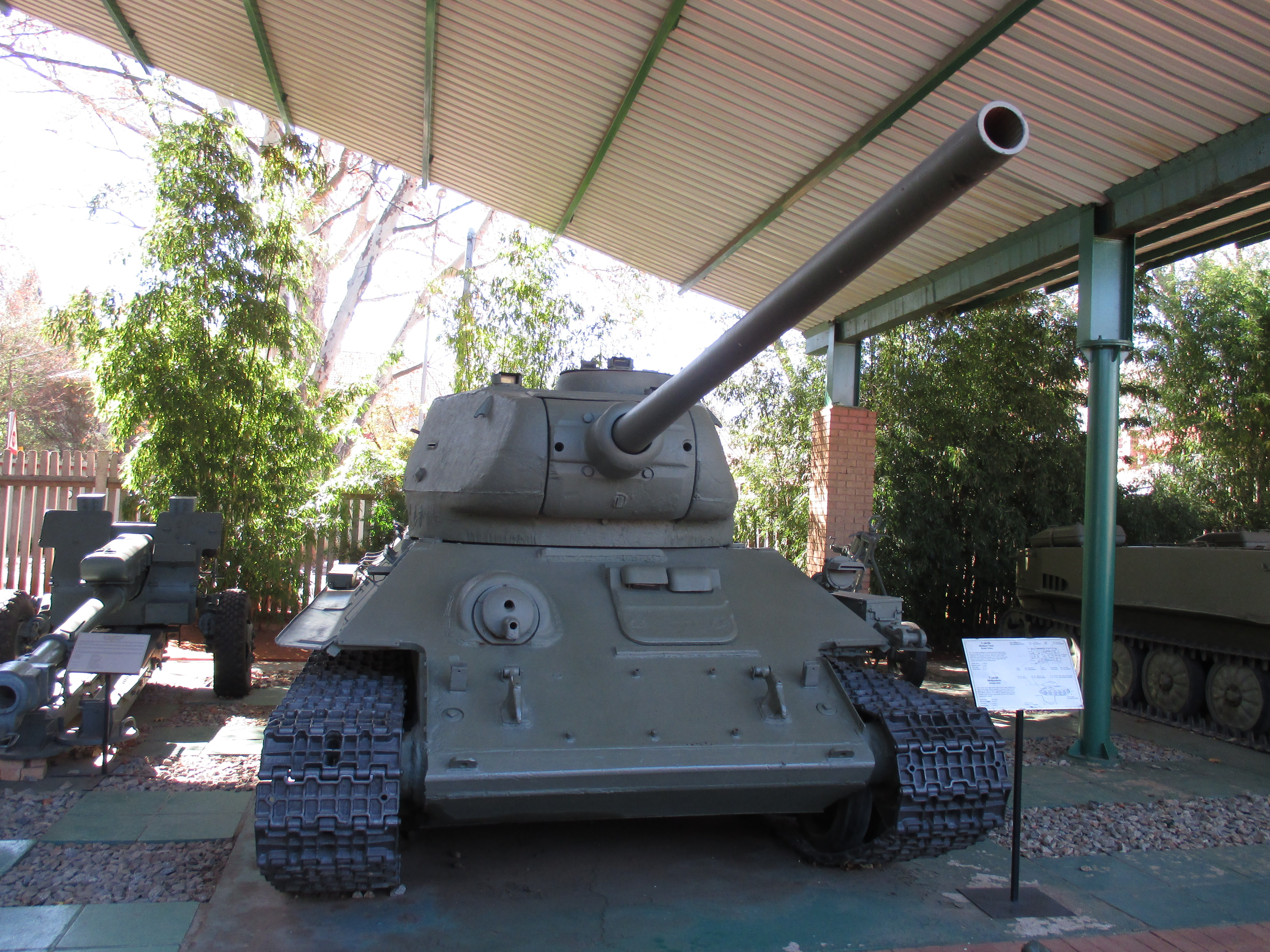
Restored FAPLA T-34-85 at the South African National Museum of Military History, Johannesburg

One of the last modern conflicts which saw the extensive combat deployment of the T-34-85 was the Angolan Civil War. In 1975, the Soviet Union shipped eighty T-34-85s to Angola as part of its support for the ongoing Cuban military intervention there. Cuban crewmen instructed FAPLA personnel in their operation; other FAPLA drivers and gunners accompanied Cuban crews in an apprentice role.

FAPLA began deploying T-34-85s against the UNITA and FNLA forces on 9 June 1975. The appearance of FAPLA and Cuban tanks prompted South Africa to reinforce UNITA with a single squadron of Eland-90 armoured cars.

=== Other regions and countries ===
==== Balkans ====
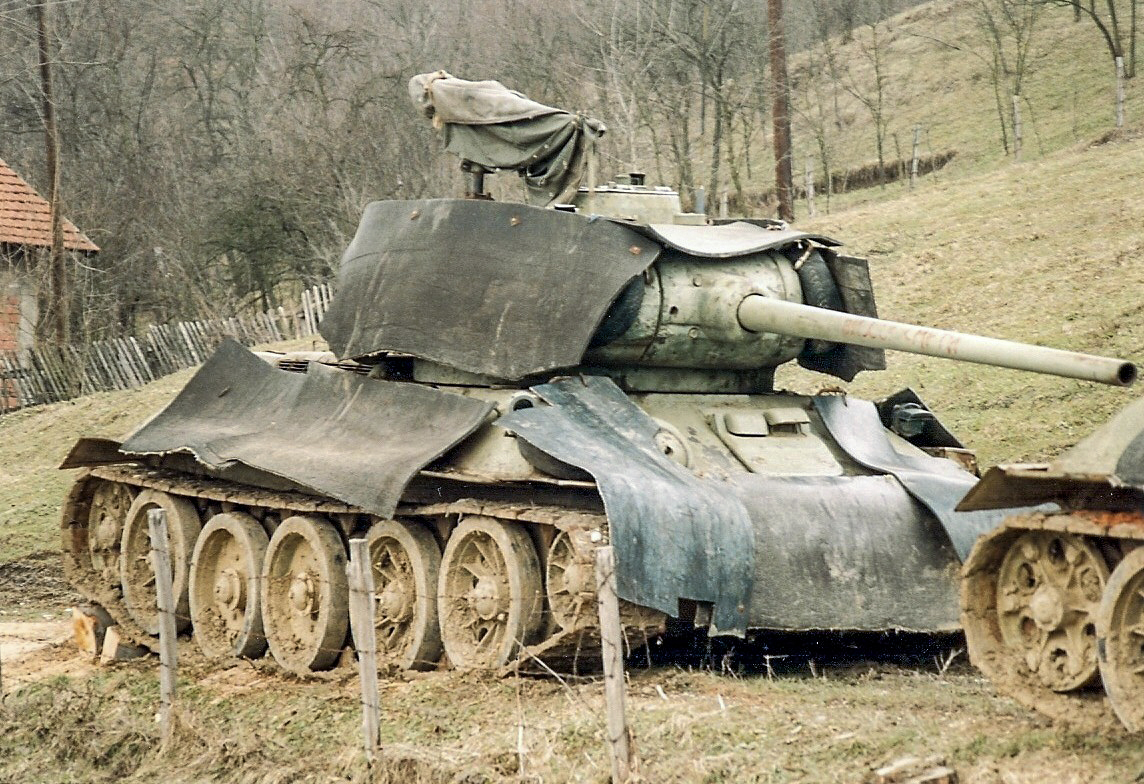
A Bosnian Serb Army T-34-85, with rubber matting added in an attempt to hide its thermal signature, near Doboj in early 1996.

In early 1991, the Yugoslav People's Army possessed 250 T-34-85s, none of which were in active service. During the breakup of Yugoslavia, the T-34-85s were inherited by the national armies of Croatia, Bosnia-Herzegovina, and Serbia and Montenegro and continued to see action during the Yugoslav Wars. Some were also acquired from Yugoslav reserve stocks by Serbian separatist armies, namely the Army of the Republic of Serb Krajina (SVK) and the Army of Republika Srpska (VRS). Most of these tanks were in poor condition at the beginning of the conflict and some were soon rendered unserviceable, likely through inadequate maintenance and lack of spares.

On 3 May 1995, a Bosnian Serb VRS T-34-85 attacked an UNPROFOR barracks occupied by the 21st Regiment of the Royal Engineers in Maglaj, Bosnia, injuring six British peacekeepers, with at least one of them sustaining a permanent disability. A number of T-34s being stored by the VRS at a base in Zvornik were temporarily confiscated by UNPROFOR as part of a local disarmament programme the following year.

==== Middle East ====
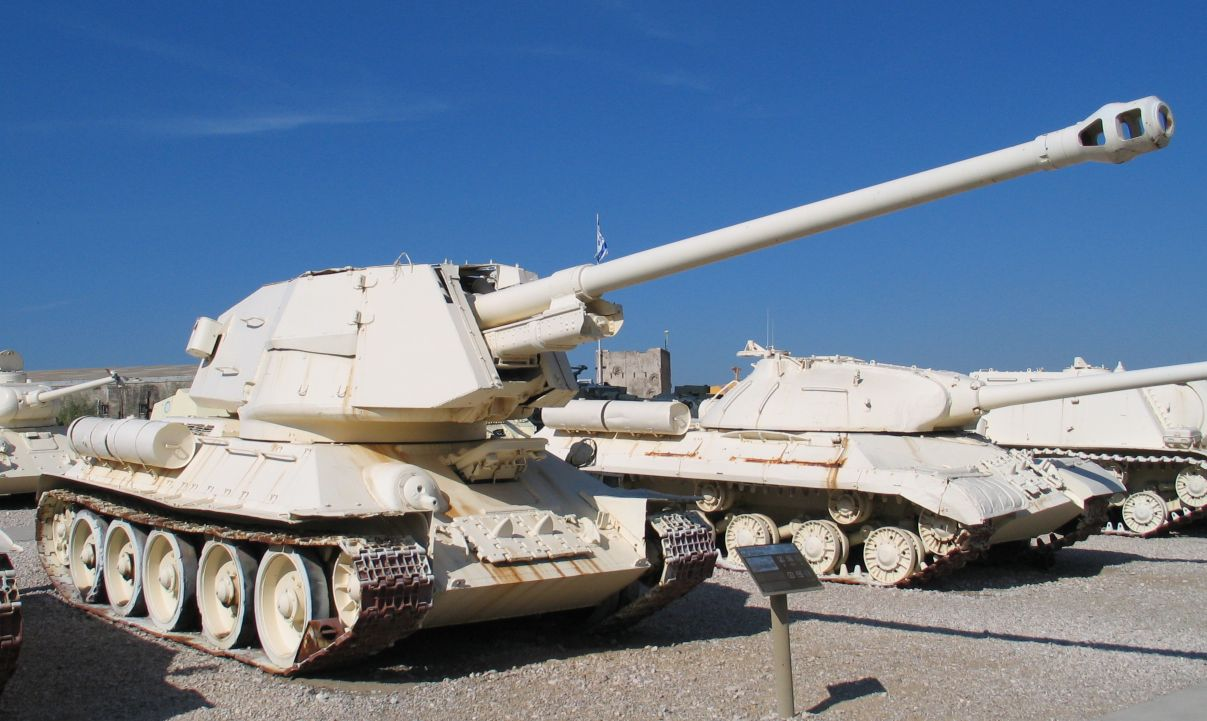
Egyptian Army T-34-100 in the Yad la-Shiryon Museum, Israel. 2005.

Czechoslovak-produced T-34-85s were used by Egypt in the Arab-Israeli Wars of 1956 and 1967 (Six-Day War) in the Sinai Peninsula. Egypt went on to build the T-34-100, a local and unique conversion that was made up of a Soviet BS-3 100 mm heavy field-artillery gun mounted within a heavily modified turret, as well as the T-34-122 mounting the D-30 gun. In 1956, they were used as regular tanks to support Egyptian infantry, the tank was still in use by the Yom Kippur War in October 1973.

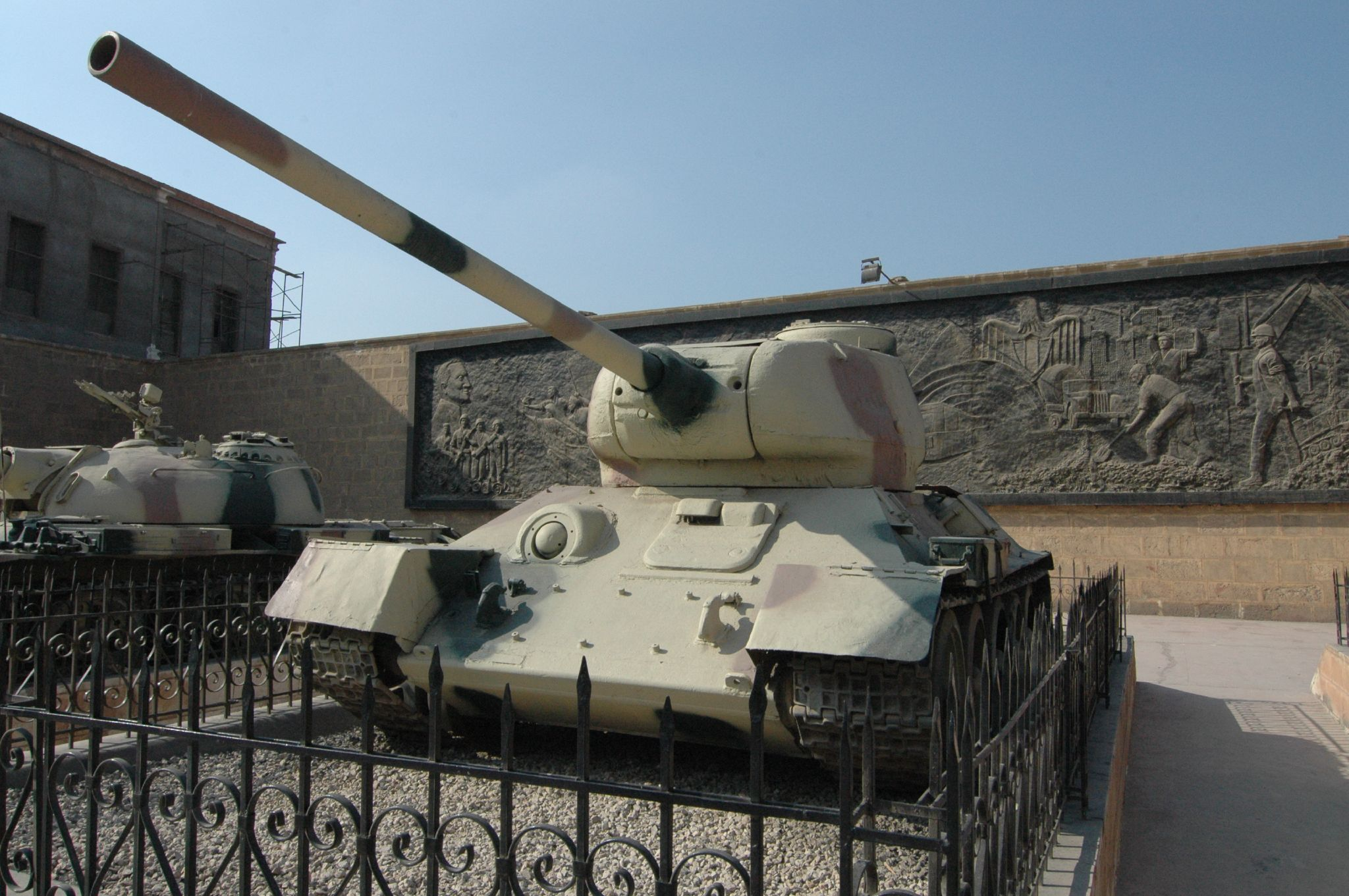
Egyptian Army T-34-85 in the Egyptian Military museum

The Syrian Army also received T-34-85s from the Soviet Union and they took part in the many artillery duels with Israeli tanks in November 1964 and in the Six-Day War of 1967.

During the Lebanese Civil War, the Palestine Liberation Organization had some T-34s alongside more modern T-54 and T-55s. These tanks were mostly dug in, serving as pillboxes.

==== Warsaw Pact ====
T-34-85s equipped many of the armies of Eastern European countries (later forming the Warsaw Pact) and the armies of other Soviet client-states elsewhere. East German, Hungarian and Soviet T-34-85s served in the suppression of the East German uprising of 17 June 1953 as well as the Hungarian Revolution of 1956.

==== Afghanistan ====
T-34-85s were sporadically available in Afghanistan. During the Soviet–Afghan War, most of the T-34s were fielded by the Sarandoy internal security forces. Some were also kept in service with the Army of the Democratic Republic of Afghanistan.

==== China ====
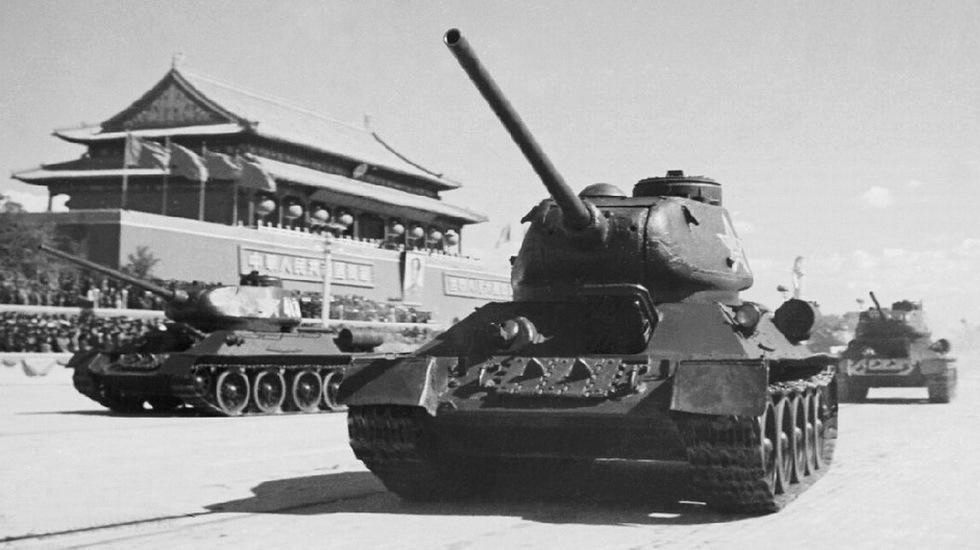
T-34-85s of the People's Liberation Army on Tiananmen Square at the 1950 Chinese National Day parade

After the formation of the People's Republic of China (PRC) in 1949, the Soviet Union sent many T-34-85s to the PRC's People's Liberation Army (PLA). Factory 617 had the ability to produce every part of the T-34-85, and during decades of service many modifications were made that visibly distinguish the PRC T-34-85 from the original specification, but no T-34-85 was actually made in China. The production plan of the T-34-85 in China was ended soon after the PRC received T-54A main battle tanks from the Soviet Union and began to build the Type 59 tank, a licensed production version of the T-54A.

==== Cuba ====
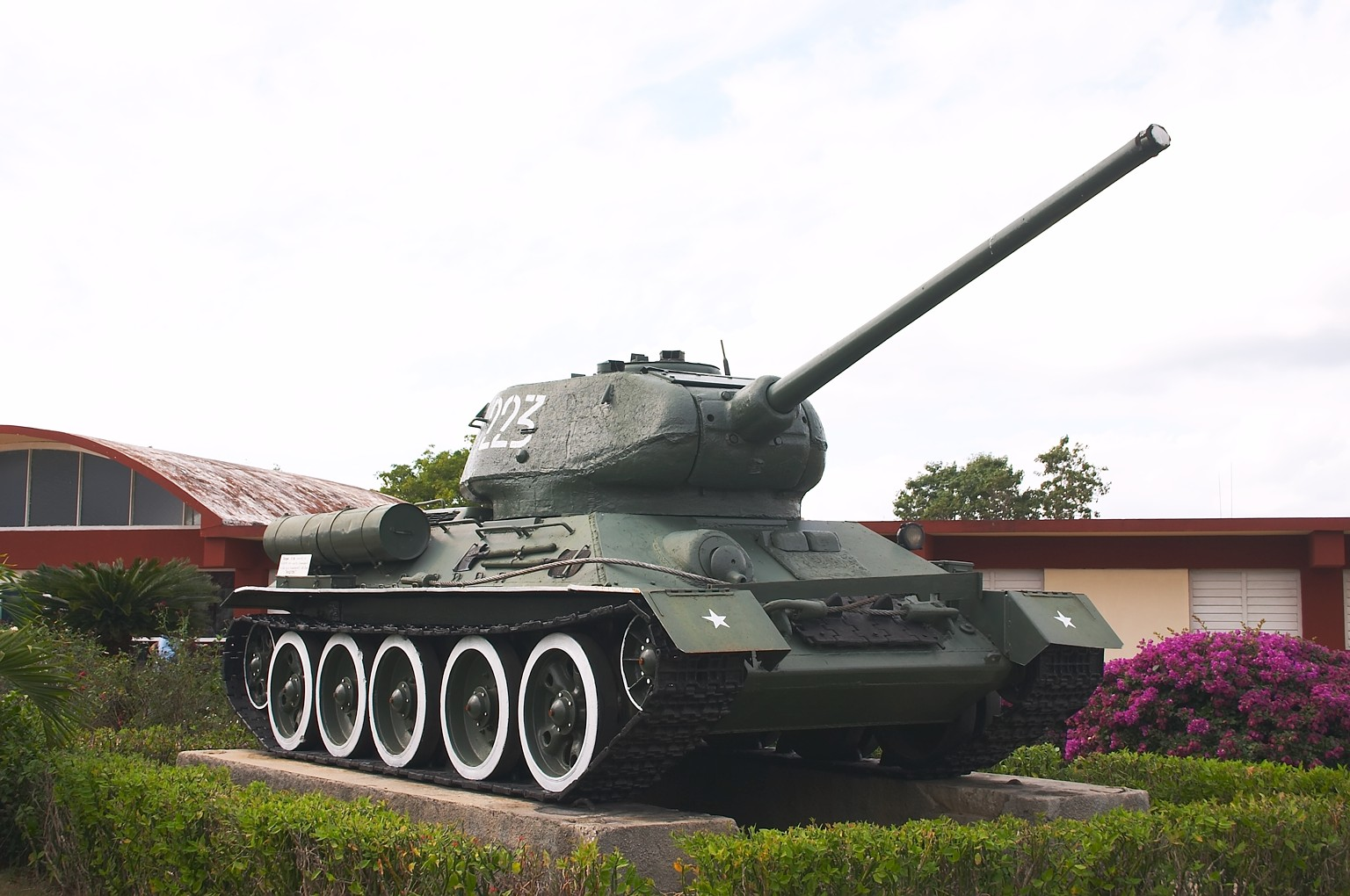
T-34-85 tank in Museo Giron, Cuba

Cuba received 150 T-34-85 tanks as military aid from the Soviet Union in 1960. The T-34-85 was the first Soviet tank to enter service with the Cuban Revolutionary Armed Forces (FAR), along with the IS-2. Many T-34-85 tanks first saw action in April 1961 during the Bay of Pigs Invasion with an unknown number destroyed or knocked out during the battle. In 1975, many T-34-85s were also donated by the USSR to the FAR to support its lengthy intervention in the Angolan Civil War.

A platoon of five Cuban T-34-85s saw combat in Angola against South African troops during the Battle of Cassinga. The tanks were based along with a company of Cuban mechanized infantry equipped with BTR-152 armoured personnel carriers. In May 1978, South Africa launched a major airborne raid on Cassinga with the objective of destroying a SWAPO (South West African People's Organisation) base there. The Cuban forces were mobilised to stop them. As they approached Cassinga they were strafed by South African aircraft, which destroyed most of the BTR-152s and three of the T-34-85s; a fourth T-34-85 was disabled by an anti-tank mine buried in the road. The remaining tank continued to engage the withdrawing South African paratroops from a hull down position until the battle was over.

Over a hundred Cuban T-34-85s and their respective crews remained in Angola as of the mid 1980s. In September 1986, Cuban president Fidel Castro complained to General Konstantin Kurochkin, head of the Soviet military delegation to Angola, that his men could no longer be expected to fight South African armour with T-34s of "World War II vintage"; Castro insisted that the Soviets furbish the Cuban forces with a larger quantity of T-55s. By 1987 Castro's request appeared to have been granted, as Cuban tank battalions were able to deploy substantial numbers of T-54Bs, T-55s, and T-62s; the T-34-85 was no longer in service.

==== Cyprus ====
Cypriot National Guard forces equipped with some 35 T-34-85 tanks helped to support a coup by the Greek junta against President Archbishop Makarios on 15 July 1974. They also saw extensive action against Turkish forces during the Turkish invasion in July and August 1974, with two major actions at Kioneli and at Kyrenia on 20 July 1974.

==== Namibia ====
In 1984, the South West African People's Organisation (SWAPO) made a concerted attempt to establish its own conventional armoured battalion through its armed wing, the People's Liberation Army of Namibia (PLAN). As part of this effort, SWAPO diplomatic representatives in Europe approached the German Democratic Republic with a request for ten T-34 tanks, which were delivered. PLAN T-34s were never deployed during offensive operations against the South African military, being confined to the role of protecting strategic bases inside northern Angola.

By 1988 the PLAN T-34-85s had been stationed near Luanda, where their crews received training from Cuban instructors. In March 1989, the PLAN tanks were mobilised and moved south towards the Namibian border. South Africa accused PLAN of planning a major offensive to influence Namibia's pending general elections, but the tank crews did not cross the border and refrained from intervening in a series of renewed clashes later that year. Between 1990 and 1991, SWAPO ordered the PLAN tanks in Angola repatriated to Namibia at its own expense. Four later entered service with the new Namibian Army.

==== Finland ====
The Soviet and Finnish armies used T-34s until the 1960s; the former included the 76.2 mm-armed versions until at least 1968, when they were used in filming the sequel to the movie The Living and the Dead. The Finnish tanks were captured directly from the Soviets or purchased from Germany's captured stocks. Many of the Т-34-85s were enhanced with Finnish or Western equipment, such as improved optics.

==== Vietnam ====
During the Vietnam War, the North Vietnamese Army was equipped with many Soviet T-34-85 and these were used in the Operation Lam Son 719, the 1972 Easter Offensive and the 1975 Spring Offensive. They were later used during the Vietnamese invasion of Kampuchea and the Sino-Vietnamese War. A small number are currently being used as trainers. The rest are in storage and no longer serve as active duty battle tanks.

==== Yemen ====
In 2015, both T-34-85 Model 1969 tanks and SU-100 self-propelled guns were photographed being used in Houthi takeover in Yemen. Some were even being fitted with anti-tank guided missiles.

=== Current active service ===
In 2018, there were nine countries that maintained T-34s in the inventories of their national armed forces: Cuba, Yemen, the Republic of the Congo, Guinea, Guinea-Bissau, Namibia, North Korea, Laos, and Vietnam. Of these operators, Vietnam possessed the largest known surviving fleet of T-34 series tanks, with 45. Yemen possessed 30, Guinea 30, Guinea-Bissau 10, Mali 21, and Laos 30. It was unclear how many Cuban and North Korean T-34s remained in service. All the Congolese, Namibian and Malian tanks were believed to be in reserve storage or inoperable. The Laotian Army retired its T-34s in early 2019 and sold them to Russia, to be used for public displays and museum exhibits.

=== Successors ===
In 1944, pre-war development of a more advanced T-34 tank was resumed, leading to the T-44. The new tank had a turret design based on the T-34-85's, but featured a new hull with torsion-bar suspension and transversely mounted engine; it had a lower profile than the T-34-85 and was simpler to manufacture. Between 150 and 200 of these tanks were built before the end of the war. With substantial drivetrain changes, a new turret, and 100 mm gun, it became the T-54, starting production in 1947. In soviet service, the T-34 was largely retired in the 60s due to the introduction of the significantly better T-54/T-55 and T-72.

== Operators ==
=== Estimated numbers in service, 2023 ===
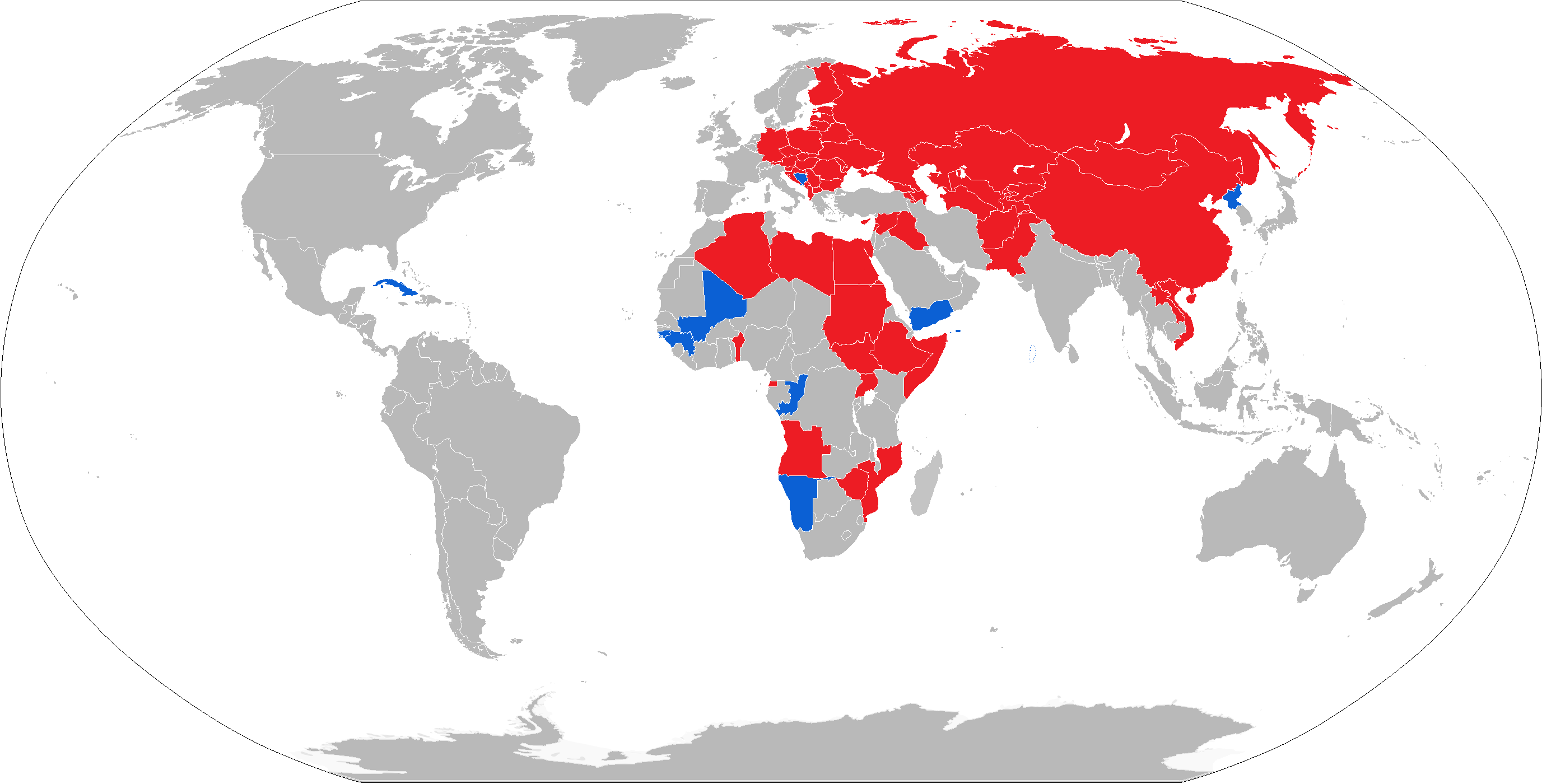
T-34 operators Current Former

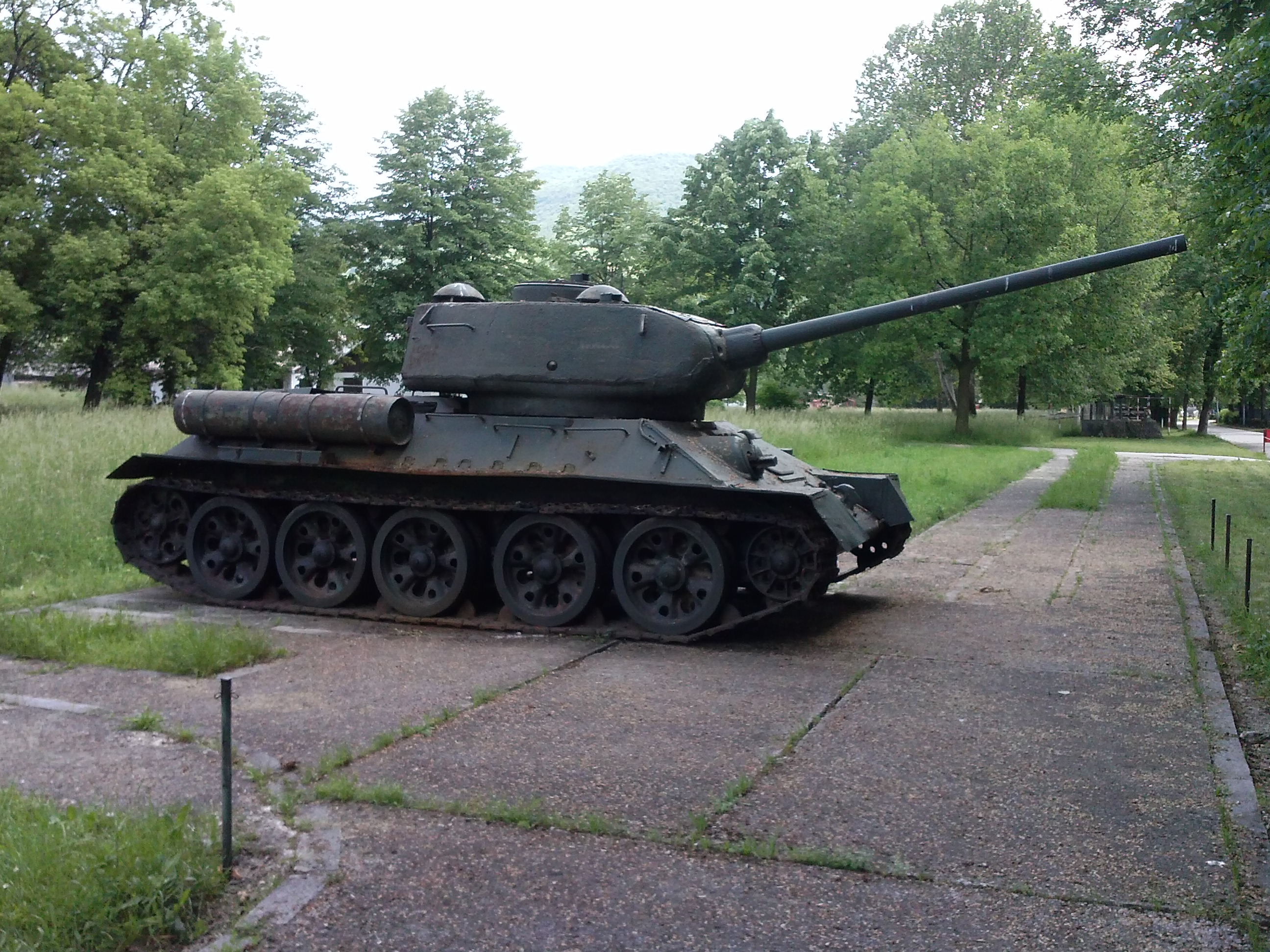
T-34-85 of the Armed Forces of Bosnia and Herzegovina, 2014

- Guinea: 45; 30 operational reported by IISS in 2023.
- Guinea-Bissau: 10 as of 2023
- North Korea: Estimated ~650; official number in service undisclosed.
- Togo: 7 T-34-85 from Egypt in 1981
- Vietnam: 300 delivered; 45 in service reported in 2023.

=== Former ===
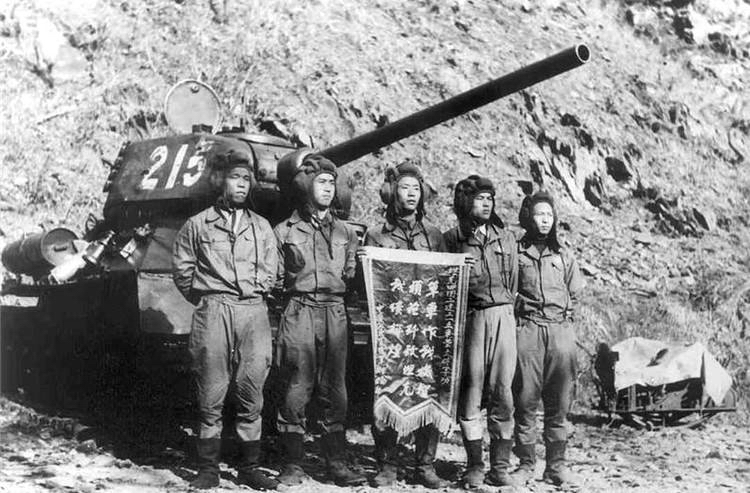
A Chinese T-34-85 during the Korean War in 1952

- Afghanistan: 175
- Algeria: 113
- Albania: 138
- Angola: 80
- Austria: 25
- Bosnia-Herzegovina
- Bulgaria: 599
- China: 2,500
- Cuba: 642; undisclosed number in 2010
- Cyprus: 32
- Czechoslovakia: 1,800
- Republic of the Congo: In reserve
- Egypt: 380
- Equatorial Guinea
- Ethiopia: 56
- Finland: 9 captured
- Germany: Captured (designated "Pz. 747(r)")
- East Germany: 872; gradually retired from service in the 1960s in favor of the T-54/55
- Hungary: 150
- Italy: 2 were captured and used by the ARMIR
- Iraq: 175
- Laos: 30
- Lebanon
- Libya: 65
- Mali: 30; retired from service
- Mongolia: 40
- Mozambique: 200
- Namibia: 4; serviceability doubtful
- Pakistan: 25
- Palestine Liberation Organization: 24
- Poland: 1,000
- Romania:

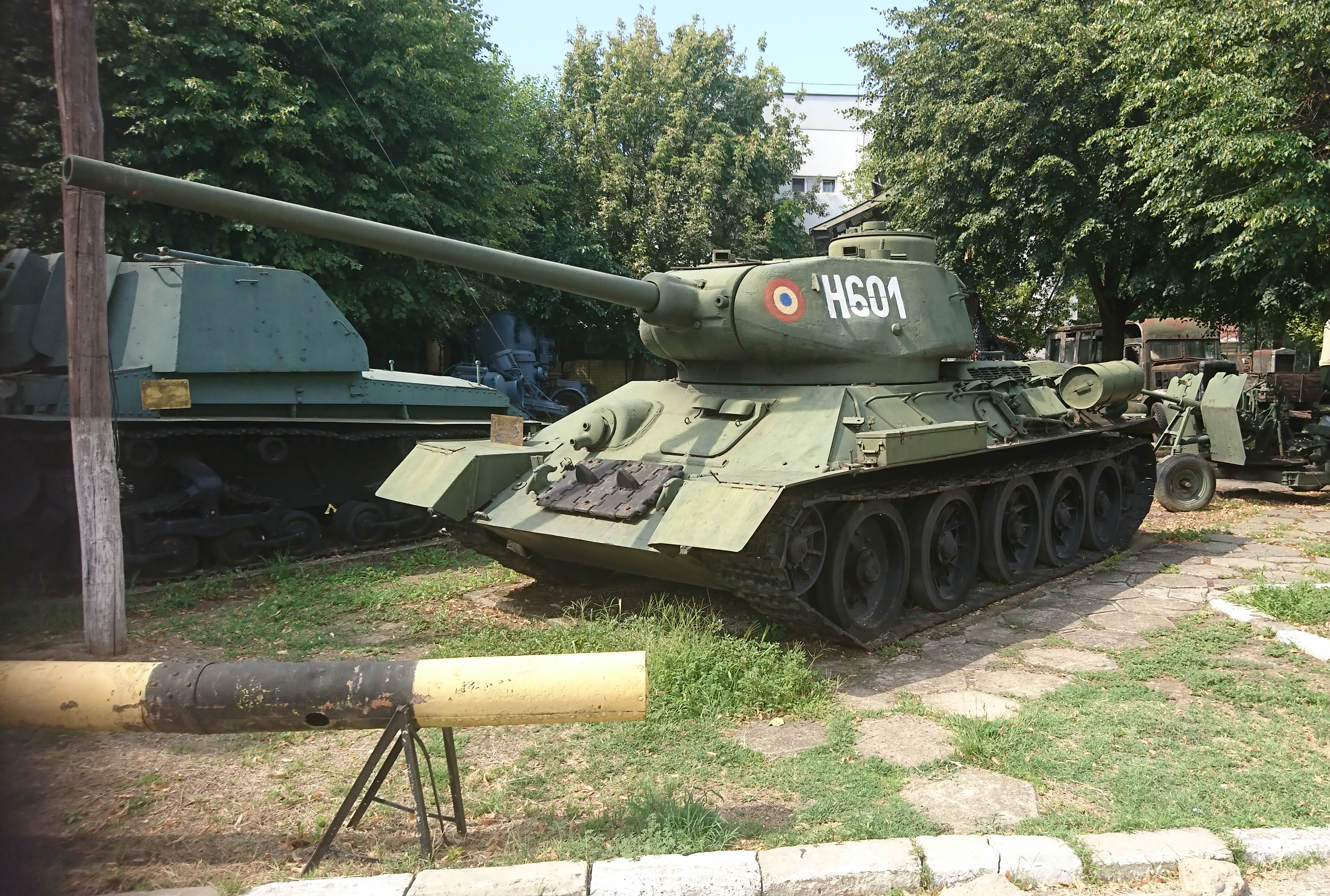
Romanian army T-34-85 next to a TACAM R-2 (National Military Museum, Bucharest)

- Kingdom of Romania: 2 captured by 1 November 1942, 4 more captured in March 1944. It was proposed to heavily modify the first two.
- Socialist Republic of Romania: 935 T-34-85s received from the USSR and Czechoslovakia from 1949 to 1957. They faced local modifications. Furthermore, 12 armoured recovery vehicles and 12 SPK-5 mobile cranes (both models based on the T-34-85 chassis) were acquired in 1955–58. 1,060 T-34-85s were in the possession of the Romanian Army in 1989, as per Zaloga and Kinnear.

- Somalia: 120
- Soviet Union
- Sudan: 20
- Syria: 200
- Uganda: 10
- UNITA
- North Yemen: 150
- South Yemen: 80
- Yemen: 250 reported in 2016; 30 reported operational by IISS in 2014. Unknown number in 2023, possibly non-serviceable.
- Yugoslavia: 889
- Zimbabwe: 10

== Symbolism ==
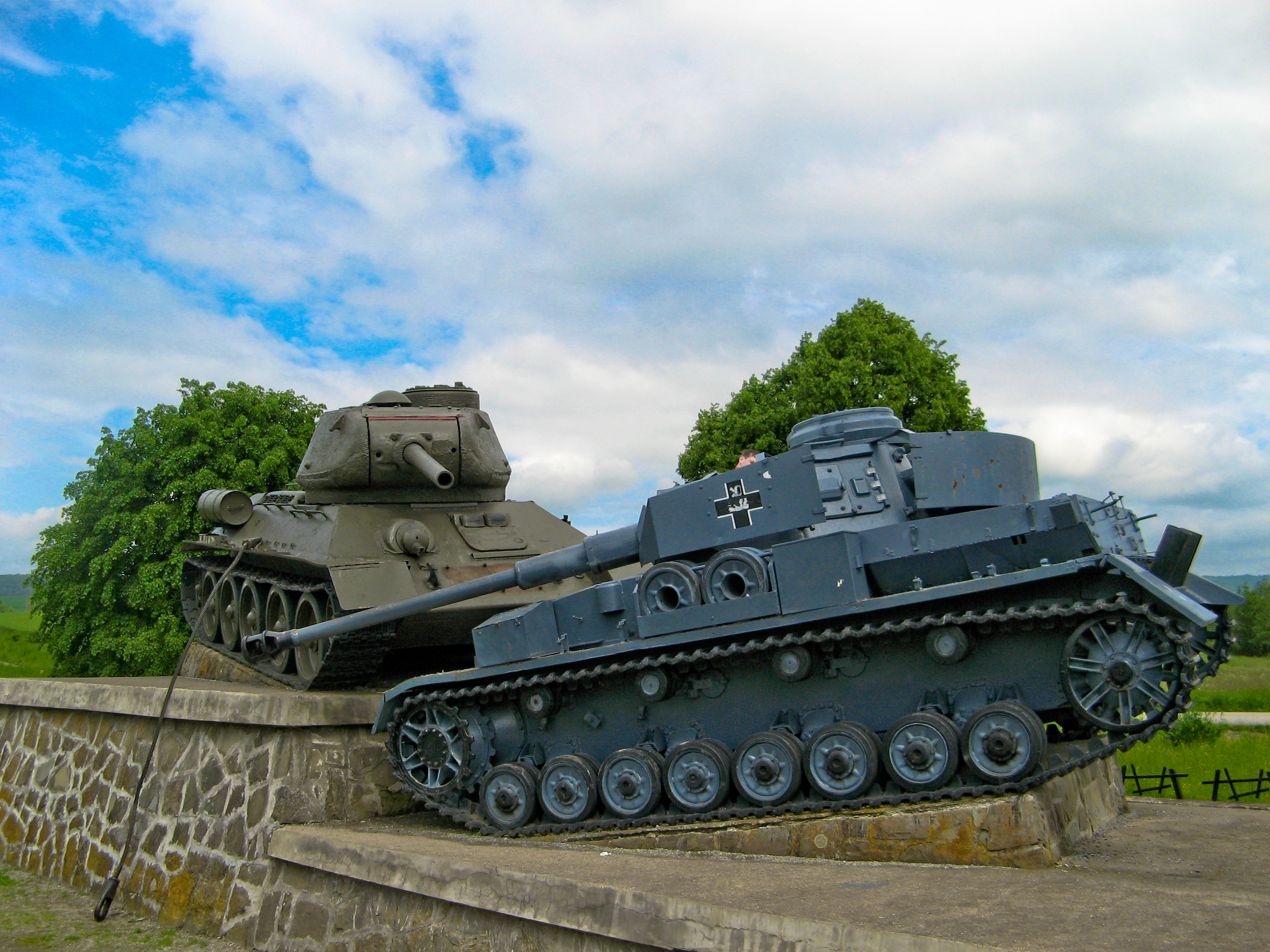
A memorial of the Battle of the Dukla Pass of 1944, near Ladomirová and Svidník, on the Slovak side of the Dukla Pass. A Soviet T-34-85 (left) together with a German Panzer IV Ausf J (right).

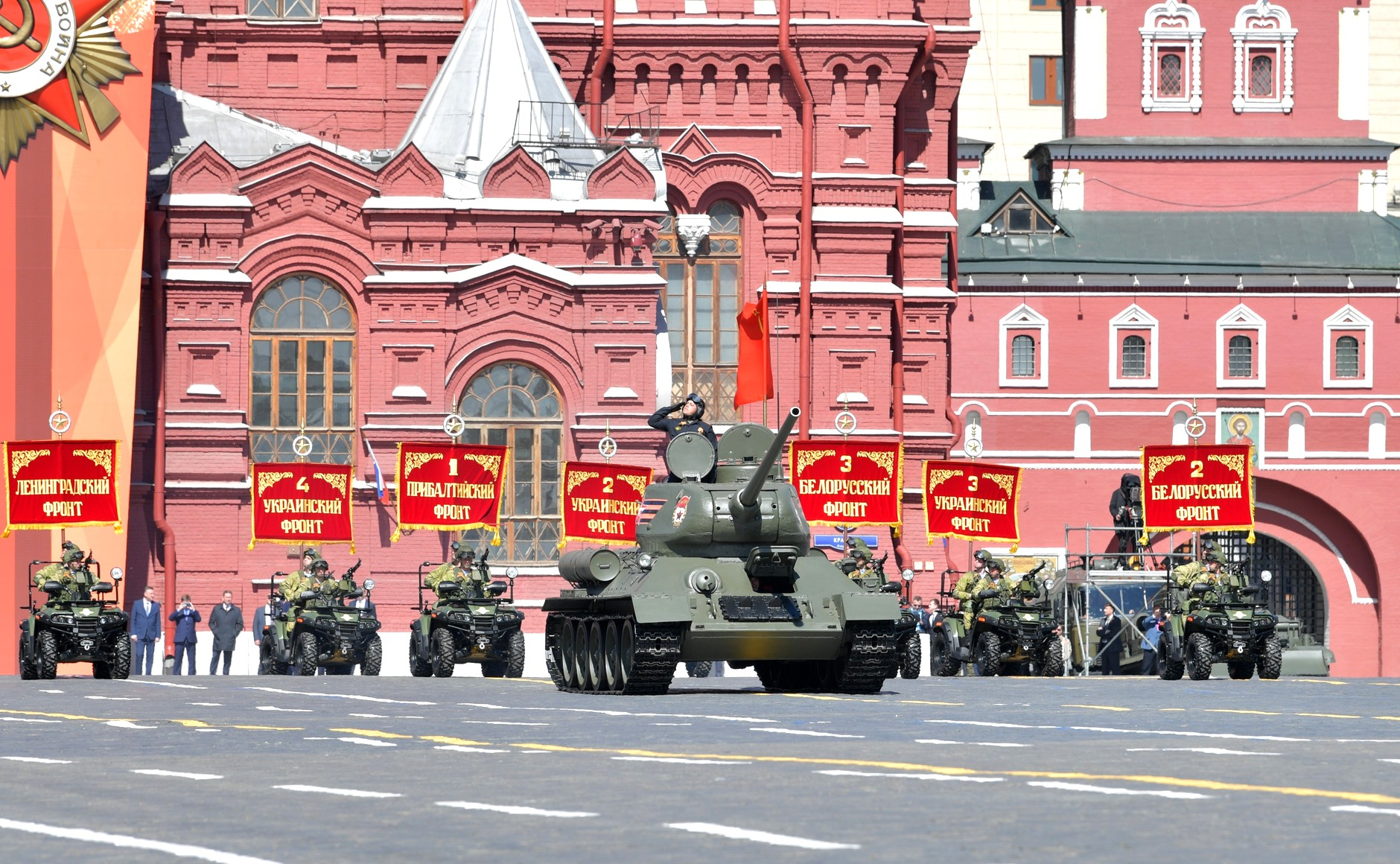
A T-34-85 during the 2018 Moscow Victory Day Parade

In Russia, in both 2023 and 2024, a single T-34-85 appeared as the sole tank in the Victory Day Parade held in Red Square in Moscow, leading to ridicule from Western media.

A T-34-85 tank monument in the East German city of Chemnitz (then known as Karl-Marx-Stadt) became the target of a 1980 bomb-attack that inflicted minor damage on the vehicle and blew out nearby windows. The bomber, Josef Kneifel, was sentenced to life imprisonment in Bautzen, but was released after a deal with the West German government in 1987. After German unification in 1990, the tank was transferred to a museum in Ingolstadt.

Another such tank, mounted atop the monument to Soviet tank crews in Prague, was the focus of significant controversy. The monument (known locally as 'Saint Tank') was intended to represent Lt I.G. Goncharenko's T-34-85 (the first Soviet tank to enter Prague during the liberation of Czechoslovakia in May 1945), but actually bore an IS-2M heavy tank. To many in Prague, the tank was also a reminder of the Soviet invasion which ended the Prague Spring of 1968. The tank was painted pink by artist David Černý in 1991. Following an official protest from the Russian government, the arrest of Černý, a coat of official green paint, public demonstrations, and a further coat of pink paint applied by fifteen parliamentary deputies, the tank was finally removed to a military museum.

Czterej pancerni i pies ("Four Tank-men and a Dog"), a very successful war-themed Polish television series of the 1960s, adapted the novel of the same name by the Polish writer Janusz Przymanowski (1922–1998), himself a People's Army of Poland volunteer. The series made T-34 tank number 102 an icon of Polish popular culture. It was also shown in other Soviet-bloc countries where it was also well received, surprisingly even in the German Democratic Republic (East Germany). At the beginning of the 21st century reruns of the black and white series still manage to attract a large audience.

In Budapest on 23 October 2006, the 2006 protests in Hungary climaxed during the 50th anniversary of the Hungarian Revolution of 1956. Protesters managed to start an unarmed T-34 tank which was part of a memorial exhibit, and used it in riots against police forces. The tank drove a few hundred metres, then stopped in front of the police, causing no personal injury.

== Variants ==
=== Main production tanks ===
There were two main production families of the T-34, each with subvariants. The identification of T-34 variants can be complicated. Turret castings, superficial details, and equipment differed between factories; new features were added in the middle of production runs, or retrofitted to older tanks; damaged tanks were rebuilt, sometimes with the addition of newer-model equipment and even new turrets.

The Red Army never had a consistent policy for naming the T-34. Since at least the 1980s, however, many academic sources (notably, AFV expert Steven Zaloga) have used Soviet-style nomenclature: T-34 for the models armed with 76.2 mm guns, and T-34-85 for models armed with 85 mm guns, with minor models distinguished by year, as T-34 Model 1940. Some Russian historians use different names: they refer to the first T-34 as the T-34 Model 1939 instead of 1940, all T-34s with the original turret and F-34 gun as Model 1941 instead of Models 1941 and 1942, and the hexagonal-turret T-34 as Model 1942 instead of 1943.

German military intelligence in World War II referred to the two main production families as T-34/76 and T-34/85, with subvariants receiving letter designations such as T-34/76A – this nomenclature has been widely used in the West, especially in popular literature. When the German Wehrmacht used captured T-34s, it designated them Panzerkampfwagen T-34 747(r), where the "r" stood for russisch ("Russian"). The Finns referred to the T-34 as the Sotka after the common goldeneye, because the side silhouette of the tank resembled a swimming waterfowl. The T-34-85 was called pitkäputkinen Sotka ("long-barreled Sotka").

==== T-34 (76) ====
The T-34 (German designation: T-34/76) was the original tank with a 76.2 mm gun in a two-man turret.

- Model 1940 (T-34/76A): Early, small production run (about 400 built) with the L-11 76.2 mm tank gun.
- Model 1941 (T-34/76B): Main production with thicker armour and the superior F-34 76.2 mm gun.
- Model 1942 (T-34/76C): Thicker armour, many minor manufacturing improvements.
- Model 1943 (T-34/76D, E, and F): Introduced May 1942 (not 1943). More ammunition and fuel, very minor armour increase. New hexagonal turret, nicknamed "Mickey Mouse" by the Germans because of its appearance with the twin, round turret-roof hatches open. Later production had a new commander's cupola.

==== T-34-85 ====
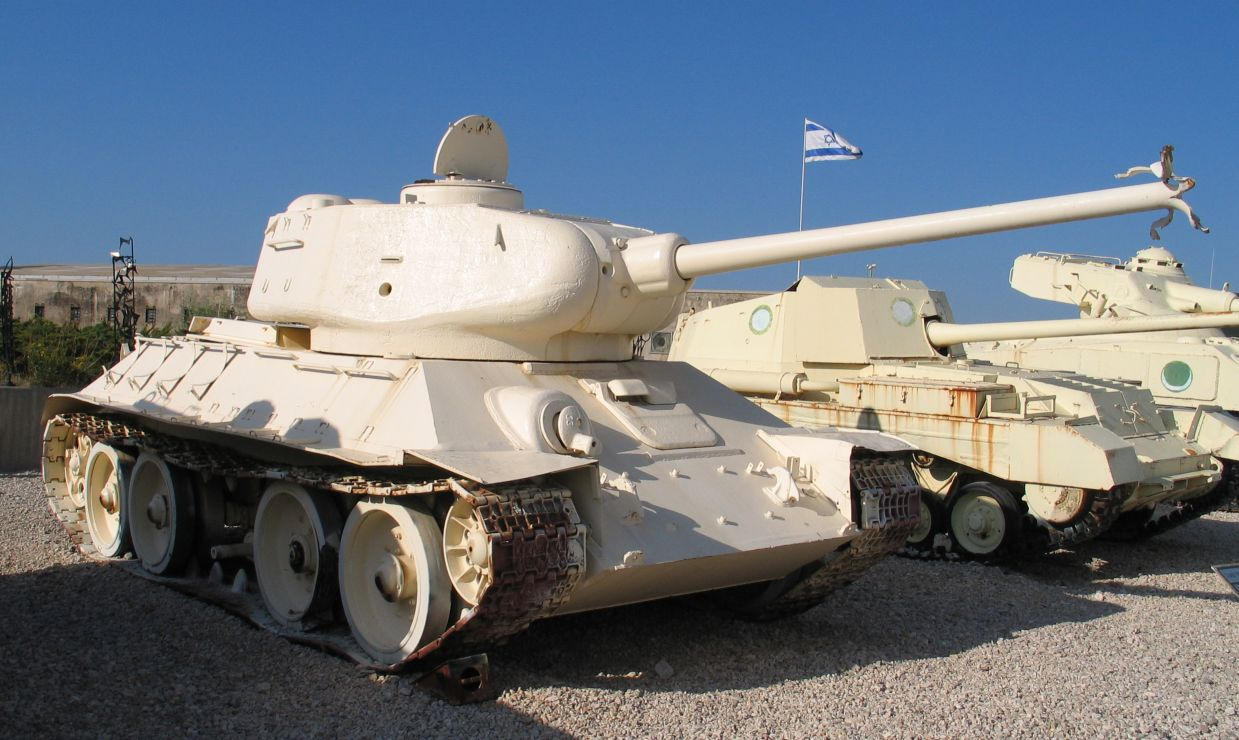
T-34-85 on display at Yad La-Shiryon, Israel

The T-34-85 (German designation: T-34/85) was a major improvement with an 85 mm gun in a three-man turret. All T-34-85 models are externally very similar.

- Model 1943: Short production run of January–March 1944 with D-5T 85 mm gun.
- Model 1944: Produced from March 1944 through to the end of that year, with simpler ZiS-S-53 85 mm gun, radio moved from the hull into a turret with improved layout and new gunner's sight.
- Model 1945: Produced from 1944 to 1945, with an electrically powered turret traverse motor, an enlarged commander's cupola with a one-piece hatch, and the TDP smoke system with electrically detonated MDSh canisters. Most produced variant of the T-34-85.
- Model 1946: Production model with the improved V-2-34M engine, new wheels, and other minor details.
- Model 1960: A refurbishing program introduced a new V-2-3411 engine and other modernizations.
- Model 1969 (also called T-34-85M): Another refurbishing program introducing night driving equipment, additional fuel, and other modernizations.

=== Other armoured fighting vehicles ===
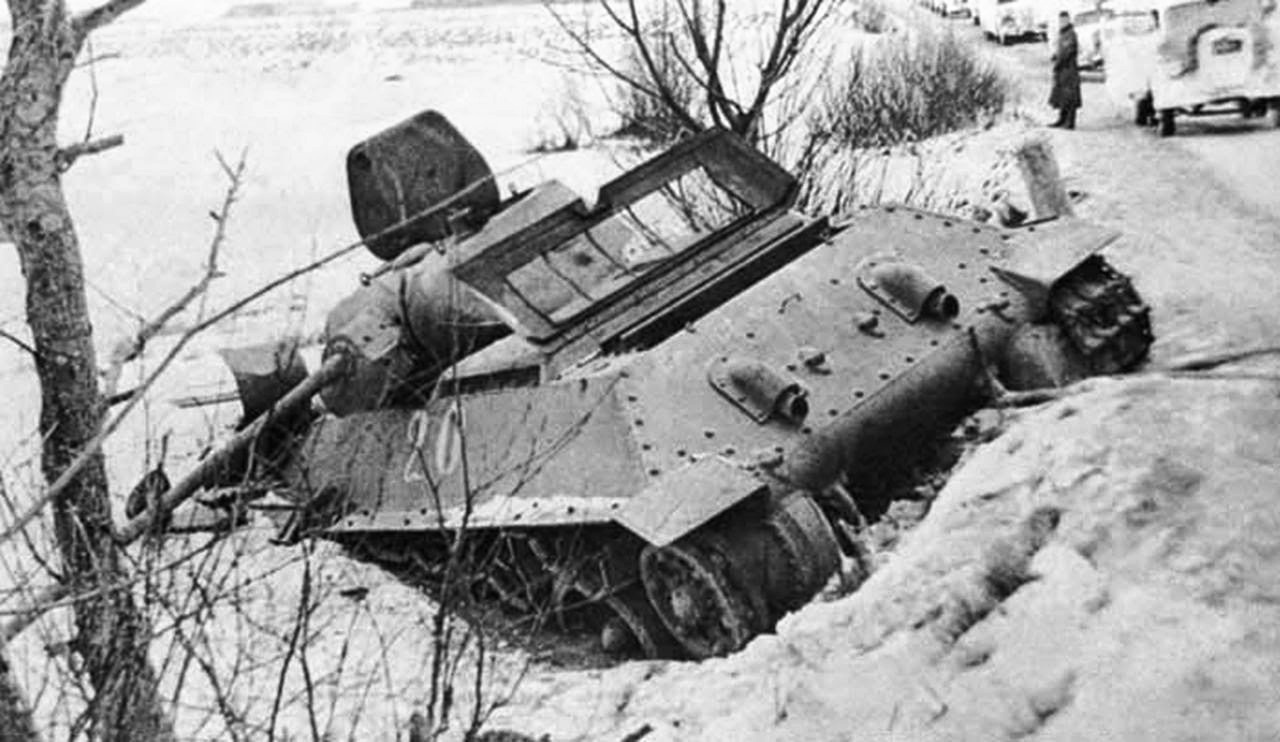
A T-34-57 in 1941

- Flame-thrower tanks: OT-34 and OT-34-85 had an internally mounted flamethrower ATO-41 (ATO-42 later) replacing the hull machine-gun. 1170 OT-34-76 (mostly based on 1942/43 versions) and 331 OT-34-85 were built.
- PT-1 T-34/76: Protivominniy Tral ("counter-mine trawl") Mine roller tank, mostly built on T-34 Model 1943 or T-34-85 chassis.
- Samokhodnaya Ustanovka (Self-propelled guns and tank destroyers):
  - SU-122, a self-propelled howitzer based on T-34 Model 1943 chassis.
  - SU-85, a tank destroyer based on T-34 Model 1943 chassis.
  - SU-100, a tank destroyer based on T-34-85 chassis.
- T-34-57: 14 T-34s were fitted with the 57-mm ZiS-4 (1941, 10 tanks) or the ZIS-4M (1943/44, 4 tanks) high-velocity 57 mm gun to be used as tank destroyers.

== Surviving vehicles ==
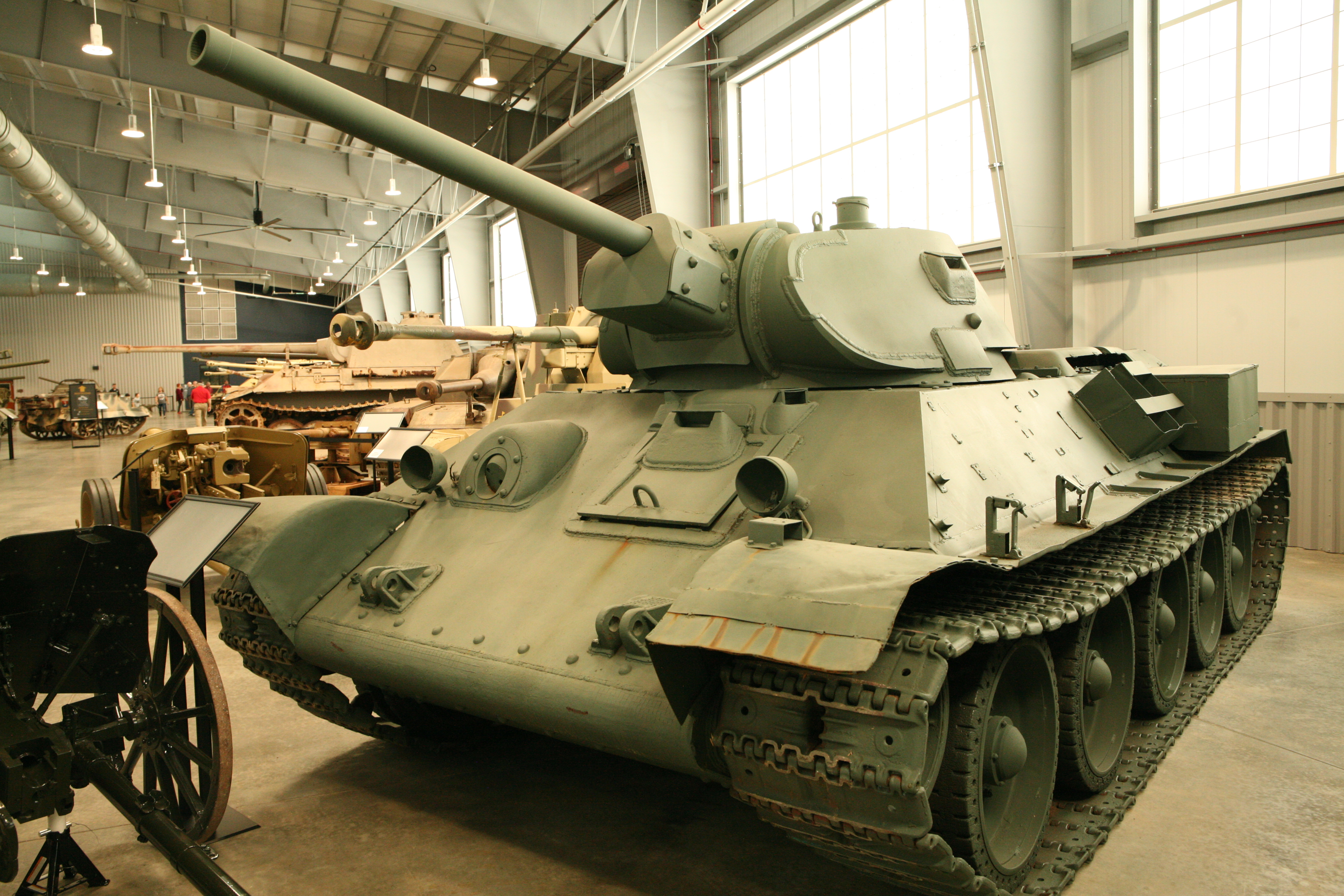
An early T-34 at the U.S. Army Armor & Cavalry Collection. This tank was captured by the Germans in Operation Barbarossa. It was sent to the U.S. after the war.

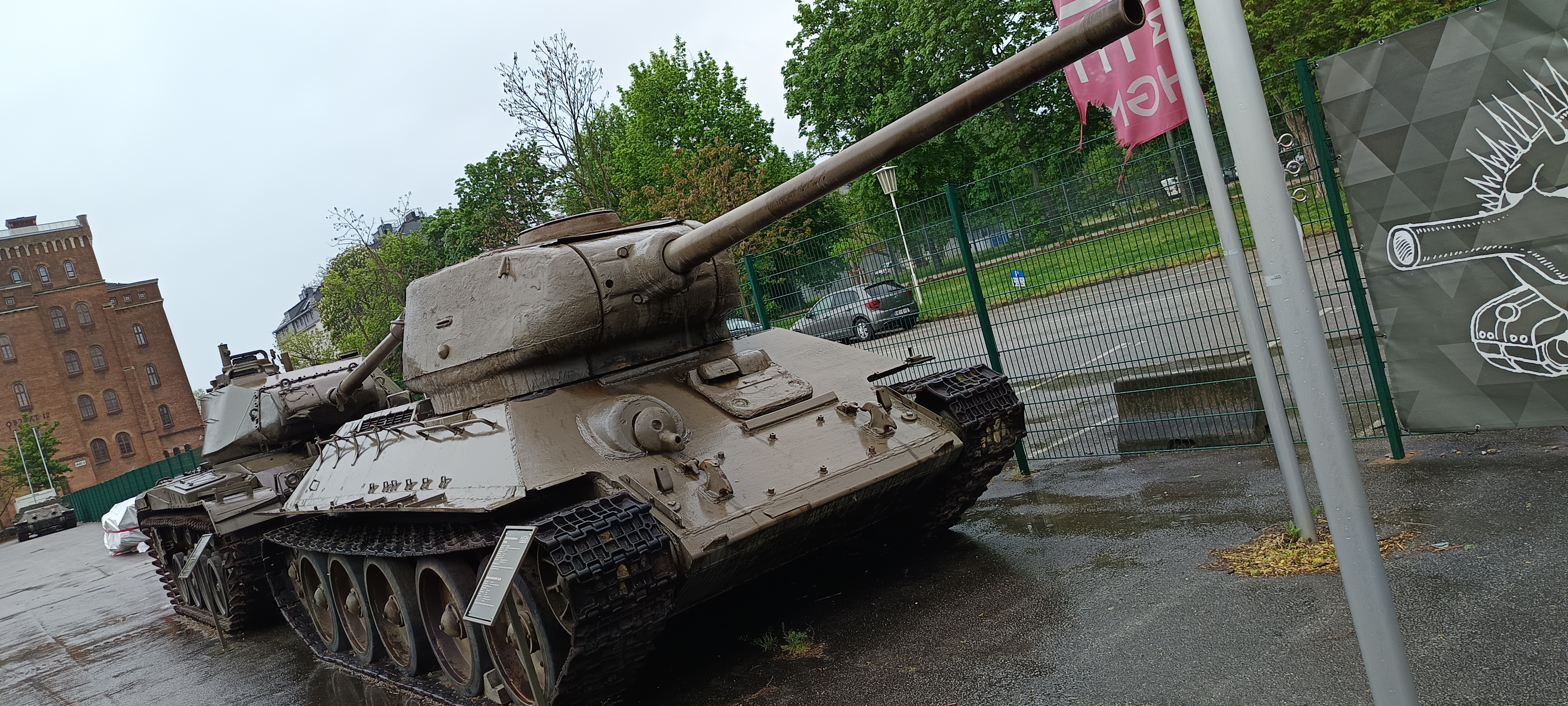
T-34-85 at the Museum of Military History, Vienna (behind it stands an M41 Walker Bulldog)

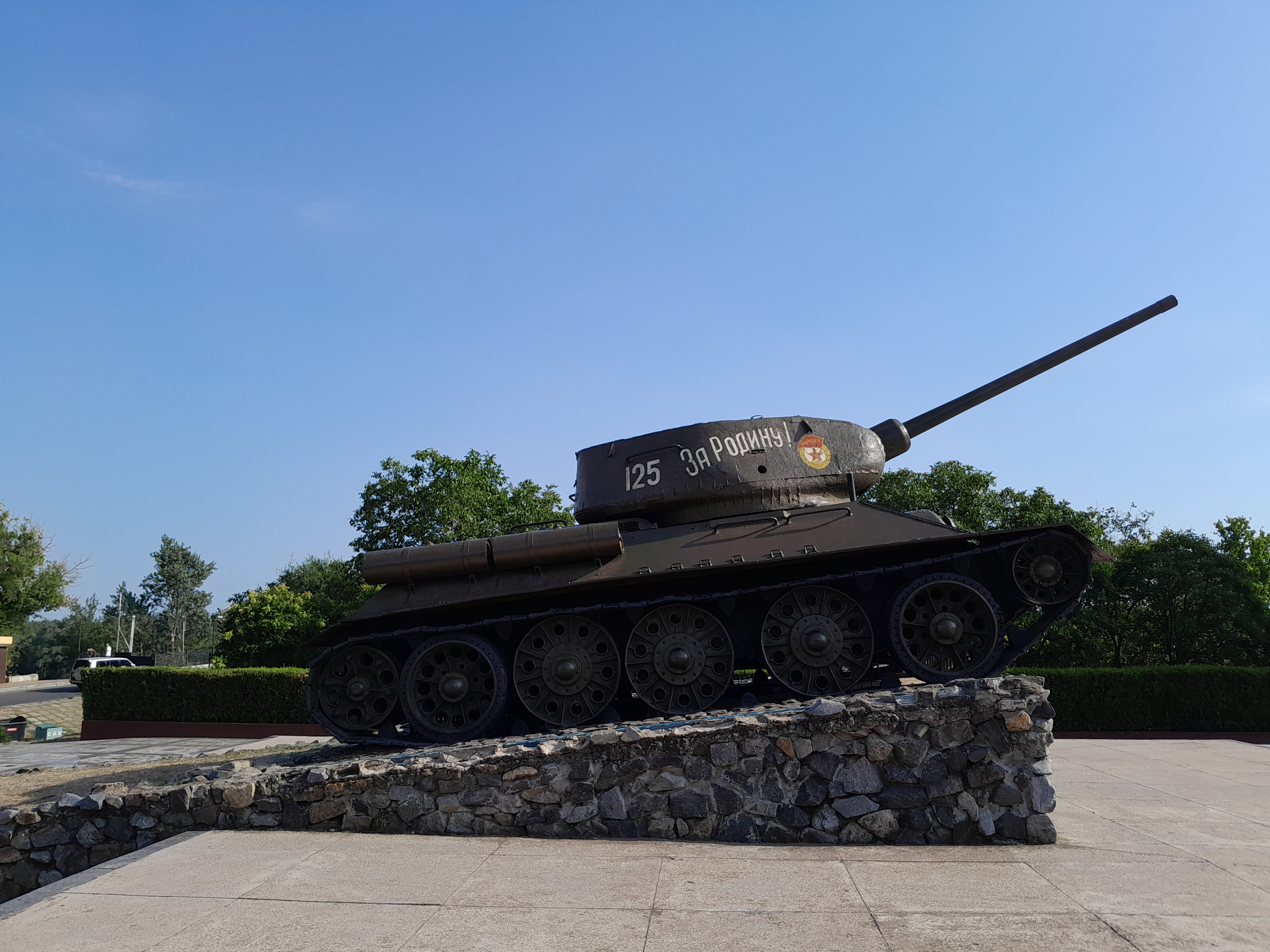
T-34 exhibited in Tiraspol, Transnistria

An enormous number of T-34s and T-34-85s were produced; the Soviets used them aggressively in campaigns in Europe and Asia, and they were distributed to the Soviets' allies all over the world. Due to all three factors, there are hundreds of surviving T-34s. Examples of this tank are in the collections of most significant military museums, and hundreds more serve as war memorials. Many are in private ownership, and demilitarised working tanks change hands for U.S. $20,000–40,000. Some still may serve in a second-line capacity in a number of Third World militaries, like Yemen, while others may find use in a civilian capacity, primarily in film-making. In many World War II films, such as Saving Private Ryan, Battle of Neretva, and Kelly's Heroes, T-34-85 tanks were modified to resemble Tiger I tanks, due to the rarity of the latter. In Sydney Pollack's 1969 movie Castle Keep, barely modified T-34-85 tanks were used as German tanks.

In 2000, a T-34 Model 1943 was recovered that had spent 56 years at the bottom of a bog in Estonia. The tank had been captured and used by retreating German troops, who dumped it in the swamp when it ran out of fuel. The anaerobic environment of the bog preserved the tank and ensured there were no signs of oil leakage, rust, or other significant water damage. The engine was restored to full working order.

Other significant surviving T-34s include a Model 1941 at the Aberdeen Proving Ground (intersection of Deer Creek Loop and Target Loop) in Maryland, one of the oldest surviving vehicles. The French Musée des Blindés at Saumur holds two T-34s, including one in full working condition that is displayed in action at its summer "Carrousel" live tank exhibition. The Mandela Way T-34 Tank, a privately owned T-34-85 named after the street in which it is sited (in Bermondsey, London), is frequently repainted by artists and graffitists. In the United States, an operational T-34-85 is located at DriveTanks, on the Ox Ranch Property in Texas. Visitors to DriveTanks can pay to drive the T-34, as well as fire the main gun. This T-34 is reported to have served on the Eastern Front during the Russian march to take Berlin.

The following document lists 196 surviving T-34/76 tanks, some of which are only partially surviving (only gun/turret/hull survives) and also listed (and included in the total 196) are some gunboats that have T-34/76 turrets.

== See also ==
- List of tanks of the Soviet Union
- Soviet combat vehicle production during World War II
- T-34 (film)

=== Tanks of comparable role, performance, and era ===
- British Comet
- British Cromwell
- Canadian Grizzly I
- German Panzer III
- German Panzer IV
- German Panther
- Hungarian Turán III
- Italian Carro Armato P 40
- Italian P43 (proposal)
- Japanese Type 3 Chi-Nu
- Japanese Type 4 Chi-To
- Romanian 1942 medium tank (proposal)
- Soviet KV-13
- Swedish Stridsvagn m/42
- American M4 Sherman

== Notes ==
Citations
