= T-34 variants =

Variants of Soviet medium tank

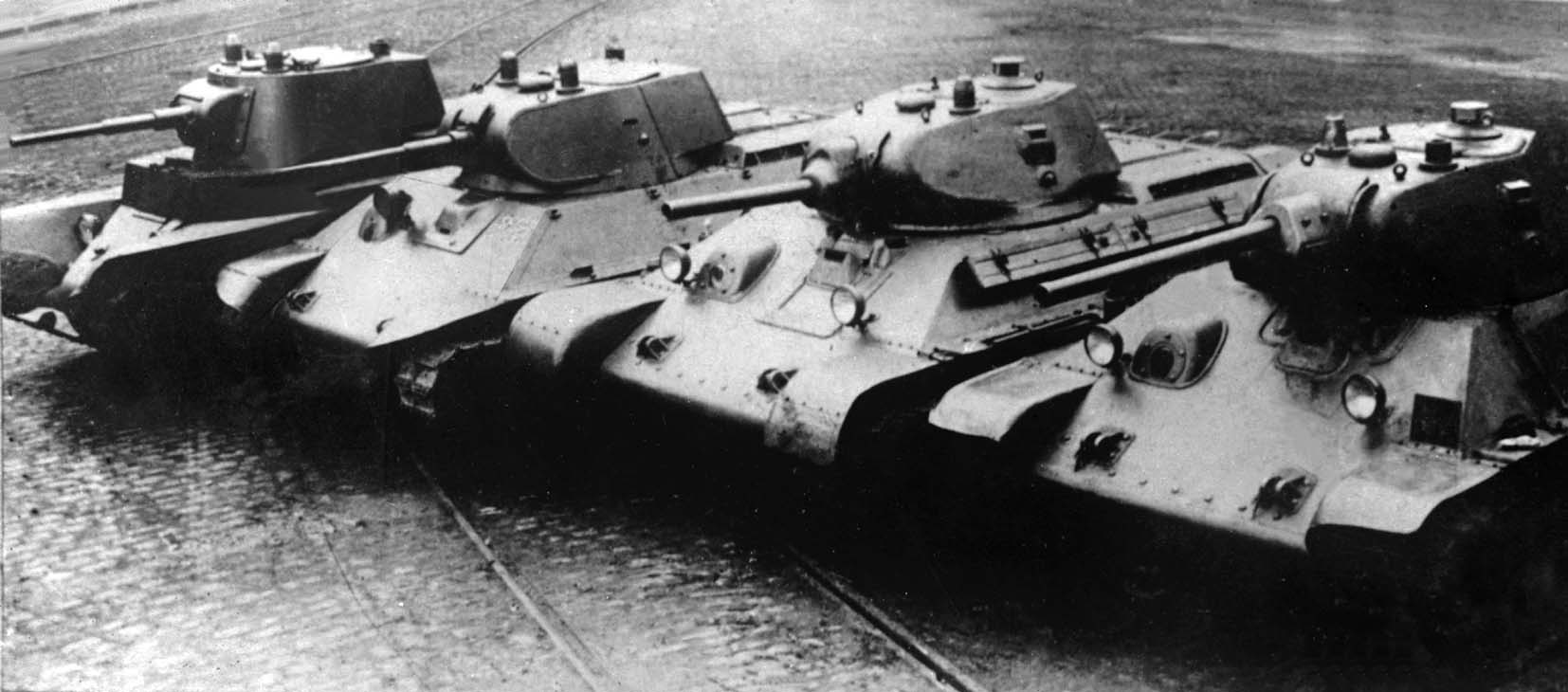
- T-34 family portrait, 1941 (BT-7, A-20, T-34 Models 1940 and 1941)
- Type: Medium tank
- Place of origin: Soviet Union

Service history
- In service: 1940–1970s (USSR)

Production history
- Produced: 1940–1956 (USSR)
- No. built: About 84,070

The T-34 medium tank is one of the most-produced and longest-lived tanks of all time.

Identification of T-34 variants can be complicated. Turret castings, superficial details, and equipment differed between factories; new features were added in the middle of production runs, or retrofitted to older tanks; damaged tanks were rebuilt, sometimes with the addition of newer-model equipment and even new turrets. Some tanks had appliqué armor made of scrap steel of varying thickness welded onto the hull and turret; these tanks are called s ekranami ("with screens"), although this was never an official designation for any T-34 variant.

== Model naming ==
Since the break-up of the Soviet Union, newly declassified sources have demonstrated that all T-34s with the original turret and F-34 gun (conventionally known as Models 1941 and 1942) were officially called "Model 1941", and hexagonal-turret T-34 (Model 1943) was officially called "Model 1942".

German intelligence in World War II referred to the two main production models as T-34/76 and T-34/85 with minor models receiving letter designations such as T-34/76A—this nomenclature has been widely used in the West, especially in popular literature.

Since at least the 1980s, many academic sources (notably AFV expert Steven Zaloga) have used Soviet-style nomenclature: T-34 and T-34-85, with minor models distinguished by year: T-34 Model 1940. (This page has adopted that convention.)

Because many different factories manufactured T-34s, with components built by subcontractors, the listing below merely gives a broad overview and does not capture every possible variant. Also, not every factory implemented all model changes at the same time. For example, factory No. 112 continued building narrow-turret 76 mm armed models long after all other plants had switched to hexagonal-turreted tanks.

== List of models and variants ==
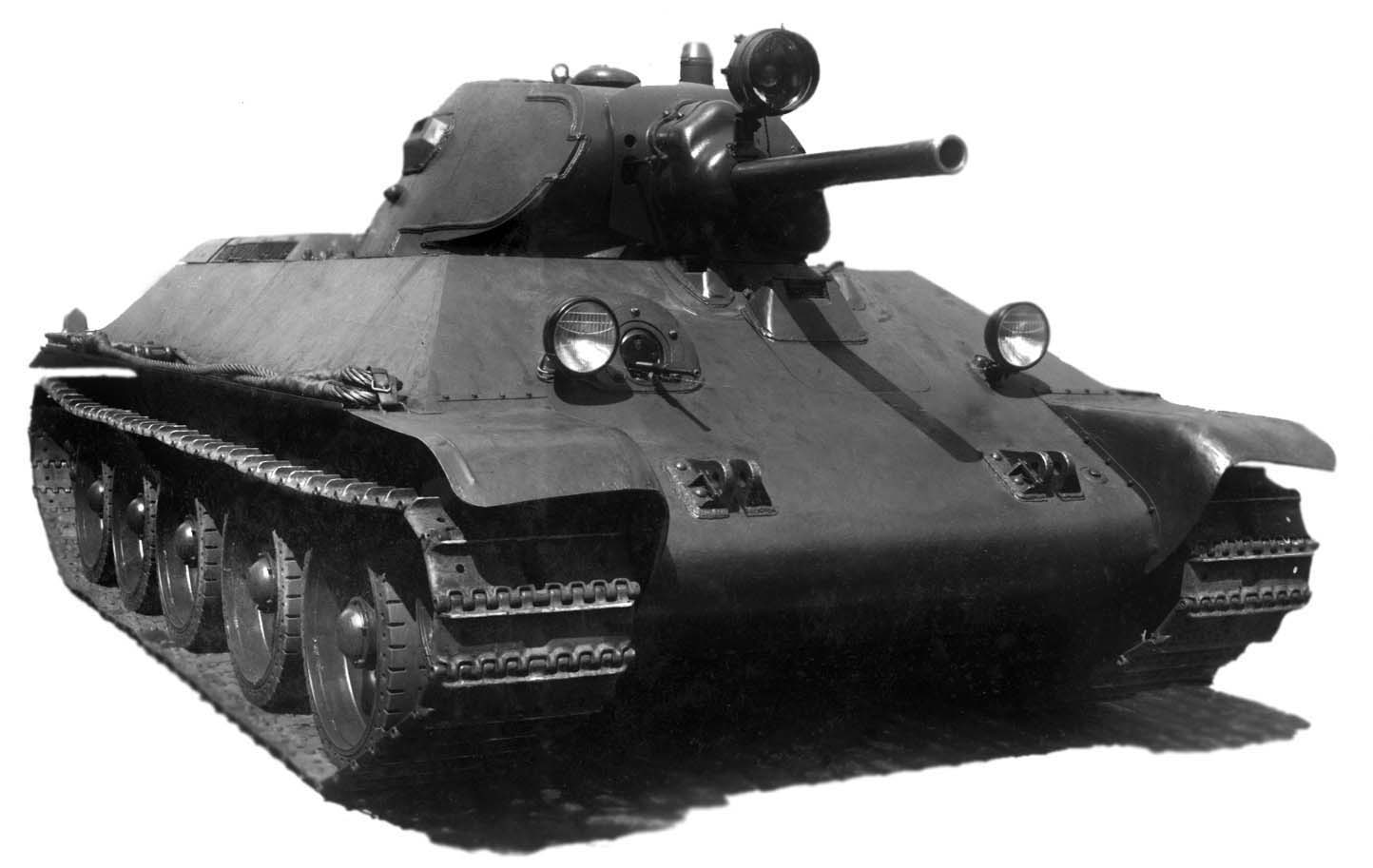
The original T-34 Model 1940 can be recognized by the low-slung barrel of the L-11 gun, below a bulge in the mantlet housing its recoil mechanism. This particular vehicle is a pre-production A-34 prototype, recognizable by the small driver's hatch and single-piece front hull.

=== Soviet Union ===
==== Tanks ====
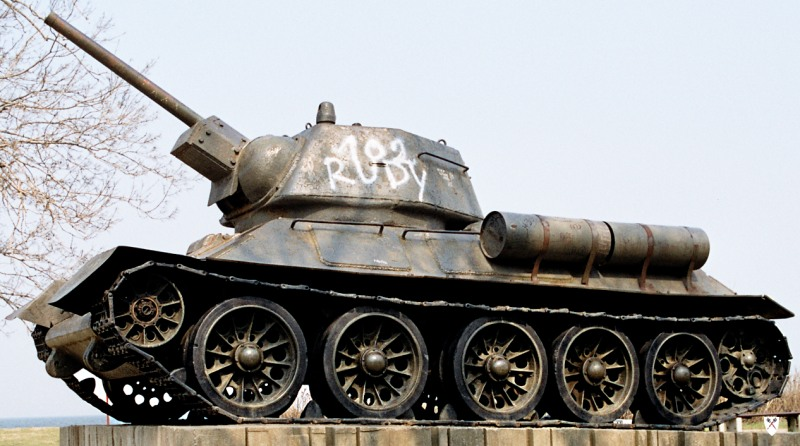
The model 1943 had an all-new hexagonal turret with bulbous trunnion housing.

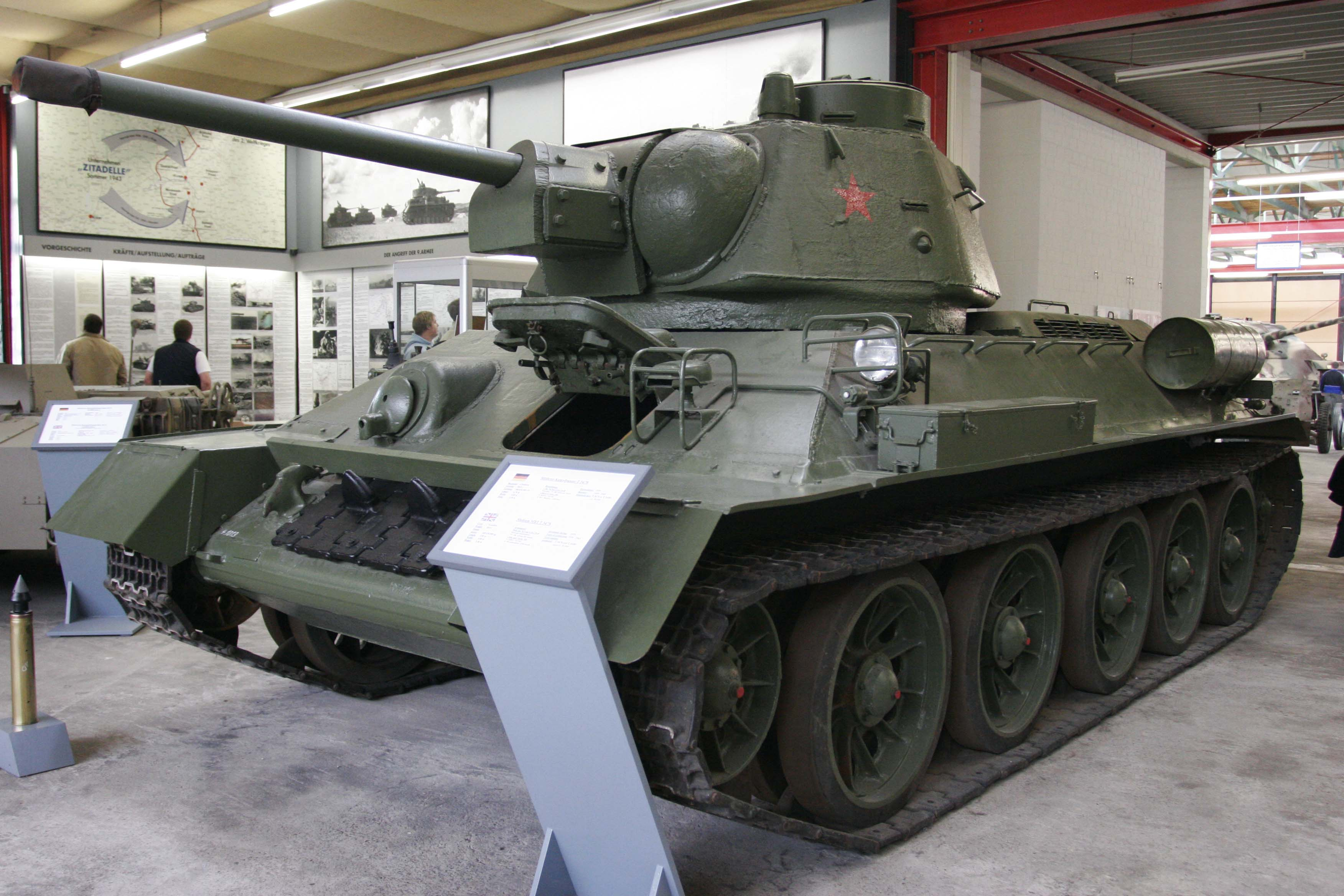
A commander's cupola was added during the model 1942 production run to improve all-round vision. This variant was known as T-34 Model 1943.

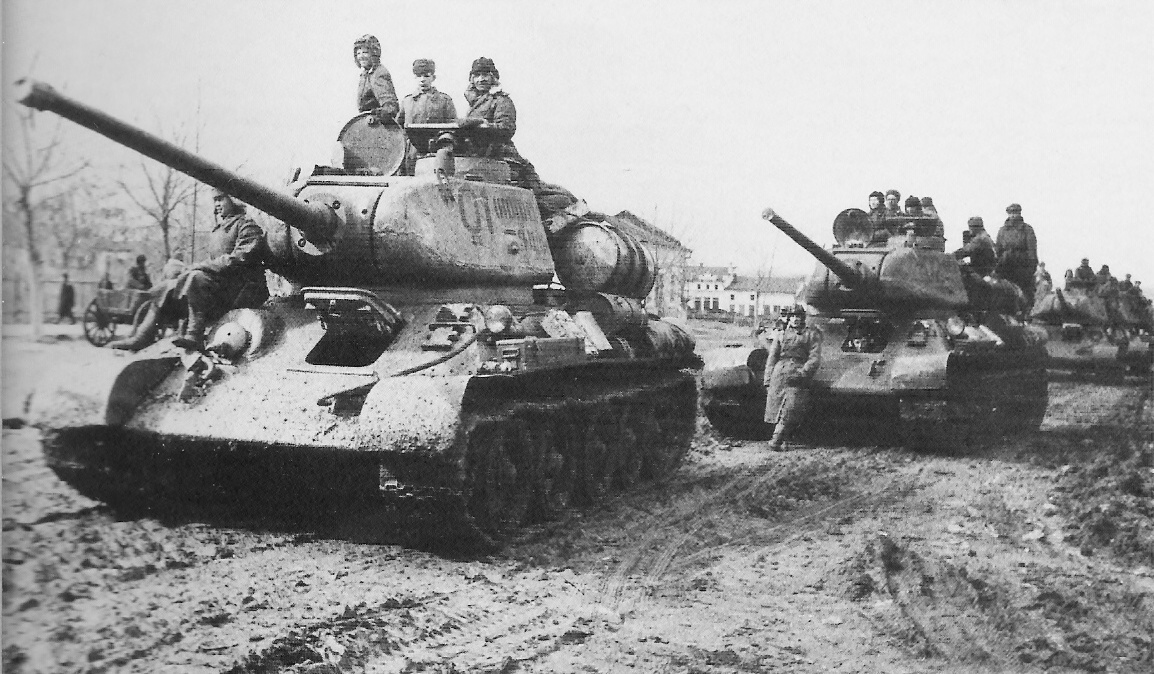
T-34-85 with D-5T gun, manufactured at Factory 112.

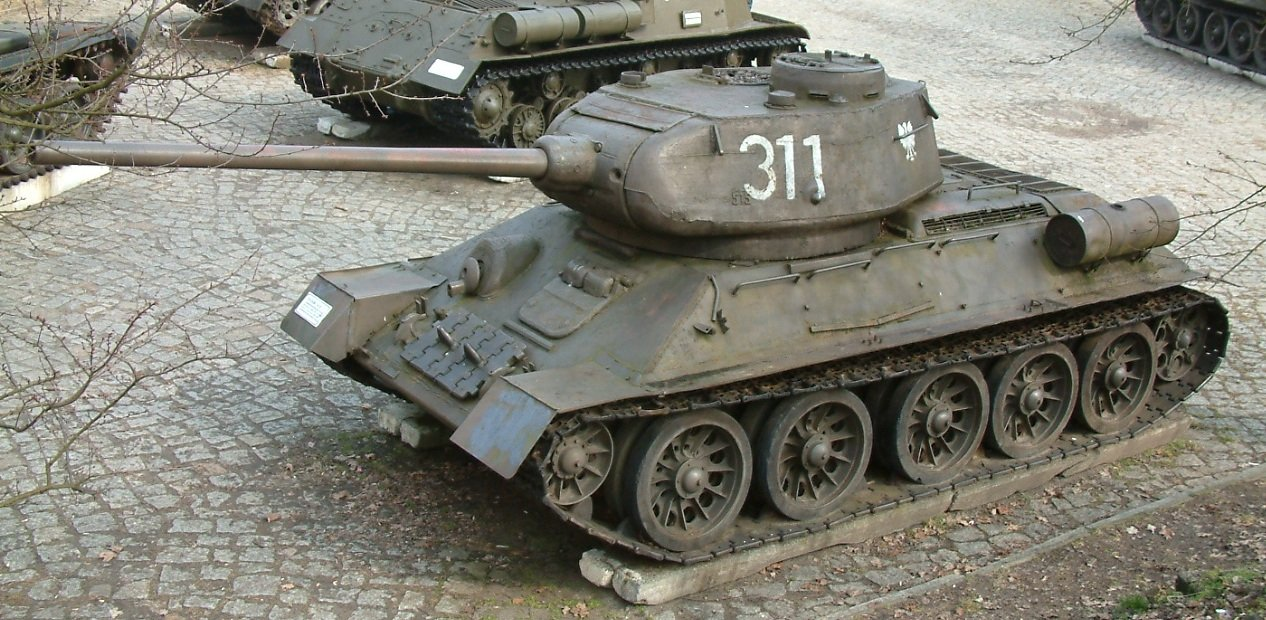
The T-34-85 had a larger three-man turret, with a long 85 mm gun.

- T-34
  - Model 1940 (German designation: T-34/76A) - This was a production model built in 1940, armed with a L-11 76.2 mm tank gun; it had a welded or cast two-man turret. Due to a shortage of new V-2 diesel engines, the initial production run from the Gorky factory was equipped with the BT tank's MT-17 gasoline-powered engine and an inferior transmission and clutch (Zheltov 2001:40–42).
  - Model 1941 (T-34/76B) - This production model was built in 1941, with a heavier armor, a cast or welded two-man turret, and the superior F-34 tank gun.
  - Model 1942 (T-34/76C) - This was a production model built in 1942 in May, with increased armor protection and many simplified components. It had new 'waffle' tracks, new wheel patterns, a new driver's hatch and a round transmission access cover. Some had the headlight moved to the left side of the hull. Most were equipped with cast two-man turrets although a few welded ones remained.
  - Model 1943 (T-34/76D, E, and F) - This production model was built from May 1942 to 1944, with a cast or pressed hexagonal turret. It was nicknamed "Mickey Mouse" by the Germans because of its appearance with the twin round turret roof hatches open. Official Soviet military designation was Model 1942. Turrets manufactured in different factories had minor variations, sometimes called "hard-edge", "soft-edge", and "laminate" turrets, but in military service these details did not warrant different designations.
    - Earlier production is sometimes called Model 1942/43, and was designated T-34/76D by German intelligence.
    - Later production variants had a new commander's cupola. This variant was referred to as T-34/76E by the Germans.
    - Turrets produced at Uralmash in Sverdlovsk (Yekaterinburg) had a distinctive rounded appearance because they were made in a special forge. Tanks produced with these turrets there and at Chelyabinsk were called T-34/76F by the Germans.
  - T-34-57 - A very small number of T-34s were fitted with the ZiS-4 L/73 high-velocity 57 mm gun in 1941 and 1943 to be used as tank destroyers. This gun had better penetration than the 76.2 mm F-34 (140 mm of steel at 500 m, as opposed to 90 mm), but the small HE projectile was inadequate for use against unarmored targets.
    - Only ten were produced and all were lost during fighting around Moscow in late 1941. The concept was revisited in 1943, but dropped in favor of development of the new T-34-85.
  - OT-34 - A T-34 flame-thrower tank fitted with an internally mounted flamethrower replacing the hull machine-gun. Usually it was a modified Model 1941 with the ATO-41 flamethrower or Model 1942 with ATO-42.
- T-34M - This unit was a prototype (A-43) with improved armor, hexagonal three-man turret, torsion bar suspension, and increased fuel and ammunition storage. Five hulls were built, but development was abandoned when the war broke out.
- T-34-85
  - Model 1943 - This production model was built from February to March 1944 at Zavod 112, with the 85 mm D-5T gun and a new larger cast three-man turret, a commander's cupola and two dome-shaped ventilators clustered together on top of the turret.
  - Model 1944 - This was a production model built from March 1944 to the end of 1944, with the simpler 85 mm ZiS-S-53 gun. The radio was moved from the hull into the turret and the commander's cupola was moved rearward. There was an improved layout and a new gunner's sight.
  - Model 1945 - This was a production model built in 1944–45, with an electrically powered turret traverse motor, an enlarged commander's cupola with a one-piece hatch, squared front fenders, and the TDP (tankovoy dimoviy pribor) smoke system with electrically detonated MDSh canisters.
  - Model 1946 - This was a production model built in 1946, with the improved V-2-34M engine, new wheels and other minor details.
  - Model 1960 - A refurbishing program introduced a new V-2-3411 engine and an improved air cleaner, a cooling and lubrication system, a battery generator, new BDSh smoke canisters, an infrared headlight, a driver's sight and a 10-RT radio set instead of the old 9-R.
  - Model 1969 (also called T-34-85M) - A refurbishing program that introduced the new R-123 radio set, 'starfish' road wheels similar to those on the T-54/55 tank, night driving equipment, drivetrain improvements, repositioned or removed smoke canisters to make a space for additional 200-litre external fuel tanks and a ditching beam at the rear. An external fuel pump was added to ease refueling.
  - OT-34-85 (sometimes called TO-34) - A T-34-85 flamethrower tank, fitted with a ATO-42 in place of the bow machine gun.
  - T-34-100 - OKB #9 Factory #183 built one example armed with a 100mm ZIS-100. Attempts were also made to mount a 100mm D-10-34 in a T-34-85 turret and a prototype T-44 turret. Due to the added weight of the new gun, the bow machine gunner and machine gun were removed. These models were not accepted into production because of damage caused to the turret ring when firing along with unacceptable recoil. A new gun, the LB-100, was then fitted - this had much lower recoil and passed all tests, however by then the war was all but over, and the T-44 was better suited than the old T-34 chassis.

==== Tank destroyers ====
- SU-85 was a T-34-based tank destroyer armed with an 85 mm D-5T gun.
  - SU-85M was an improved SU-85 with enhanced frontal armour and the commander's station raised and moved outward into a sponson.
- SU-100 was an upgrade of the SU-85M platform with an 100 mm D-10S gun.
- SU-122P was an attempt to enhance the SU-100. The model was armed with a 122mm D-25S cannon. Testing proved that the 100mm was still the superior anti-tank gun. Only one model was built and was not accepted into service.

==== Self-propelled howitzers ====
- SU-122 - This unit was a T-34 based self-propelled howitzer armed with a 122 mm M-30S howitzer.

==== Support vehicles ====
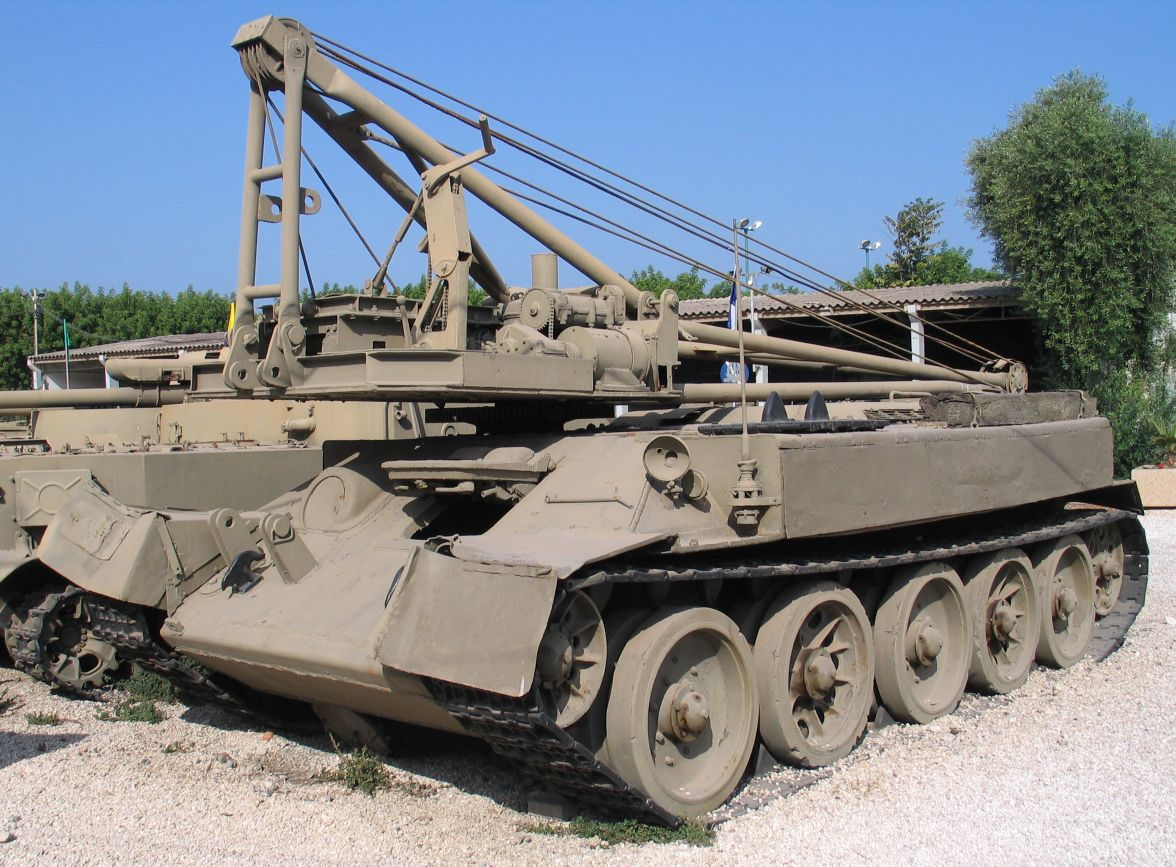
SPK-5 crane tank in Batey ha-Osef Museum, Tel Aviv, Israel, 2005

- PT-34 - This was a mine roller attachment that could be mounted on any T-34 chassis.
- T-34-T (T stands for tyagach ["tractor"]) - During World War II, some old T-34s were rebuilt as armored recovery vehicles (ARVs) with their turret removed; sometimes the turret ring was plated over or a superstructure was added in place of the turret. They were used solely for towing operations. Also known under the designation TT34.
- SPK-5 (1955) - Turretless T-34 fitted with a crane with a capacity of 10 tons on a rotatable mount fitted in the turret ring.
  - SPK-5/10M - An SPK-5 was fitted with electro-hydraulic controls for the crane.
- T-34-TO (1958) (TO stands for technicheskoye obsluzhivaniye ["technical maintenance"]) - This variant was a technical maintenance vehicle fitted with an extensive array of tools and a work platform over the engine deck.

=== Bulgaria ===
==== Fixed fortifications ====
- T-34-85 turrets were built into a bunker to create a fixed piece.

=== Cuba ===
==== Self-propelled howitzers ====
- T-34-85 were converted into a self-propelled howitzer armed with a 130mm towed field gun M1954(M46) in a cut-away turret.

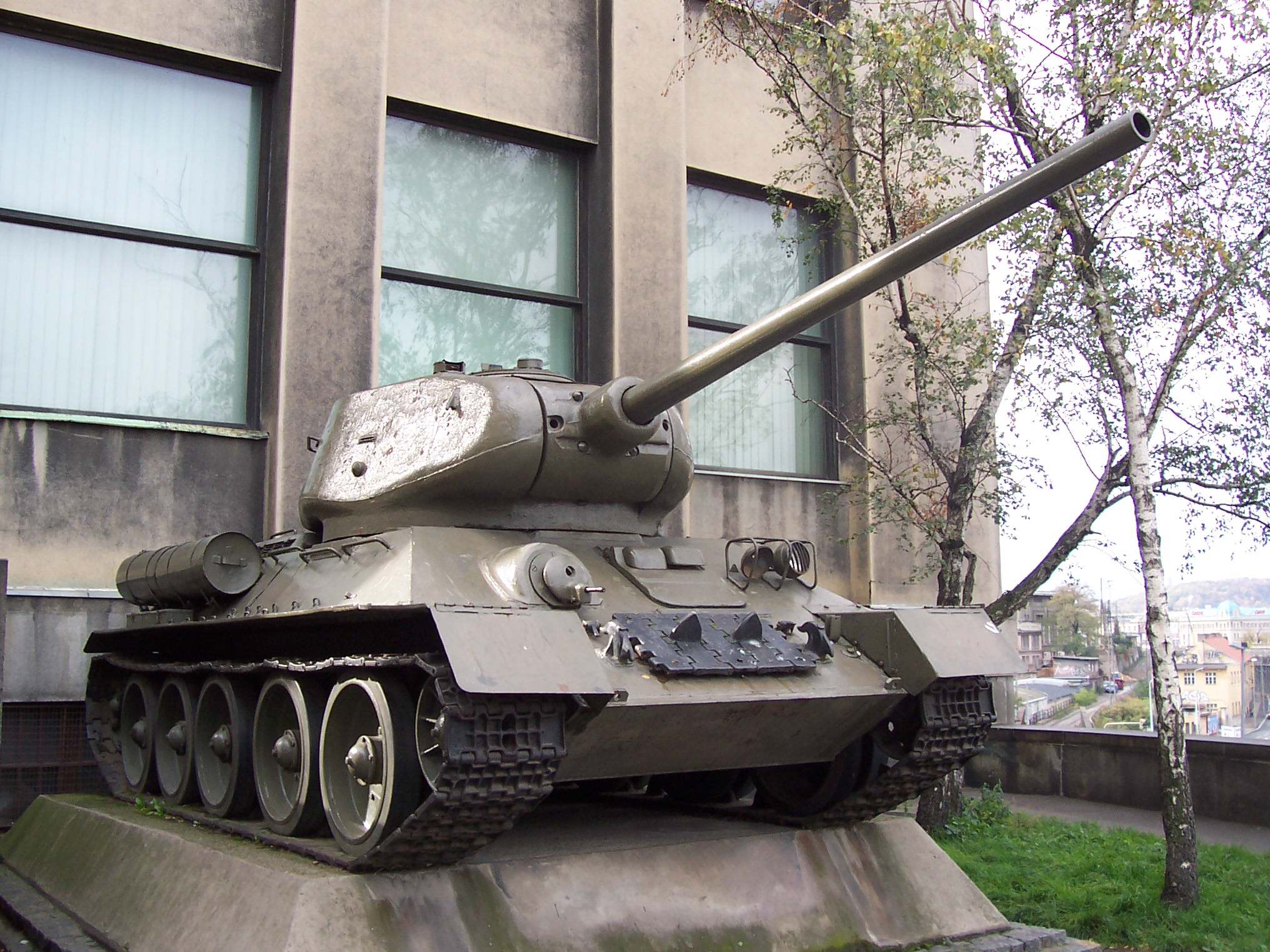
T-34-85CZ.

=== Czechoslovakia ===
==== Tanks ====
- T-34-85CZ - This was the Czechoslovak production version of the T-34-85.
- T-34/100 - A proposed modification of the T-34-85 with bigger mantlet and a 100mm gun. Never built.

==== Support vehicles ====
- MT-34 (1950s) (MT stands for mostní tank ["bridging tank"]) – This unit was a Czechoslovak conversion with a PM-34 scissors bridge carried on rollers on top of a turretless T-34.
- VT-34 (VT stands for vyprošťovací tank ["recovery tank"]) – This variation was a Czechoslovak purpose-built recovery vehicle.
- JT-34 This variation was a Czechoslovak purpose-built crane vehicle.

=== Egypt ===
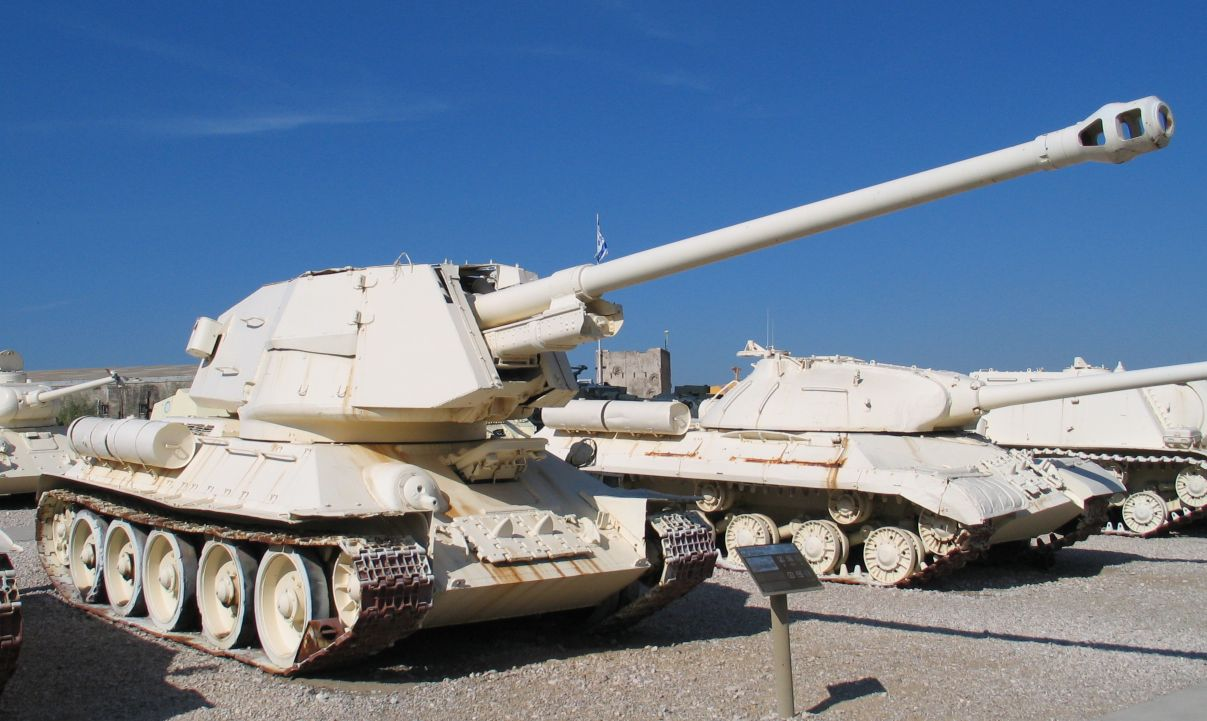
Ex-Egyptian T-100 tank destroyer next to an Ex-Egyptian Soviet-made IS-3 heavy tank in Yad la-Shiryon Museum, Israel, 2005

==== Tank destroyers ====
- T-100 - This Egyptian unit was a conversion into a tank destroyer armed with a 100 mm BS-3 anti-tank gun mounted in a heavily modified turret. The changes included flat-plate extensions in the front, rear and top of the turret. A recoil mechanism was placed under the barrel. It is also known under the designation T-34/100.

==== Self-propelled howitzers ====
- T-122 - This Egyptian conversion was a self-propelled howitzer armed with a 122 mm D-30 howitzer in a heavily modified turret. The changes included flat-plate extensions in the front, sides, rear and top of the turret. It is also known under designation T-34/122.

=== Finland ===
==== Tanks ====
- T-34-85 75mm - Experimental T-34-85's with German 75mm guns.

=== Hungary ===
==== Firefighting vehicles ====
- T-34 - tanks were converted into tracked firefighting vehicles used to fight oil fires. Two engines from MiG-21 were fitted to an overlapping mount on the turret ring.

=== Nazi Germany ===
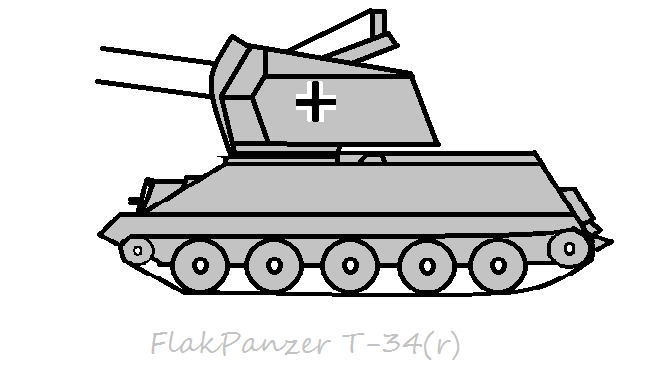
FlakPanzer T-34(r)

==== Tanks ====
- T-34 747(r) - T-34 747(r) is the designation of captured T-34-76 tanks. Some captured tanks were fitted with cupolas of the Panzer III or Panzer IV along with Schürzen side armor.

==== Self-propelled anti-aircraft guns ====
- Flakpanzer T-34 - This German conversion was a single T-34 made into a self-propelled antiaircraft gun armed with a 2 cm Flakvierling 38 in a new armored turret with an open top. The single vehicle manufactured was used by PzJgAbt 653 in July 1944.

==== Armored ammo carriers ====
- Munitionstransporter T-34(r) - One captured T-34 was converted into an ammo carrier by PzJgAbt 653 in July 1944. Such T-34(r) ammo carrier variants are also speculated to be done by other units.

=== People's Republic of China ===
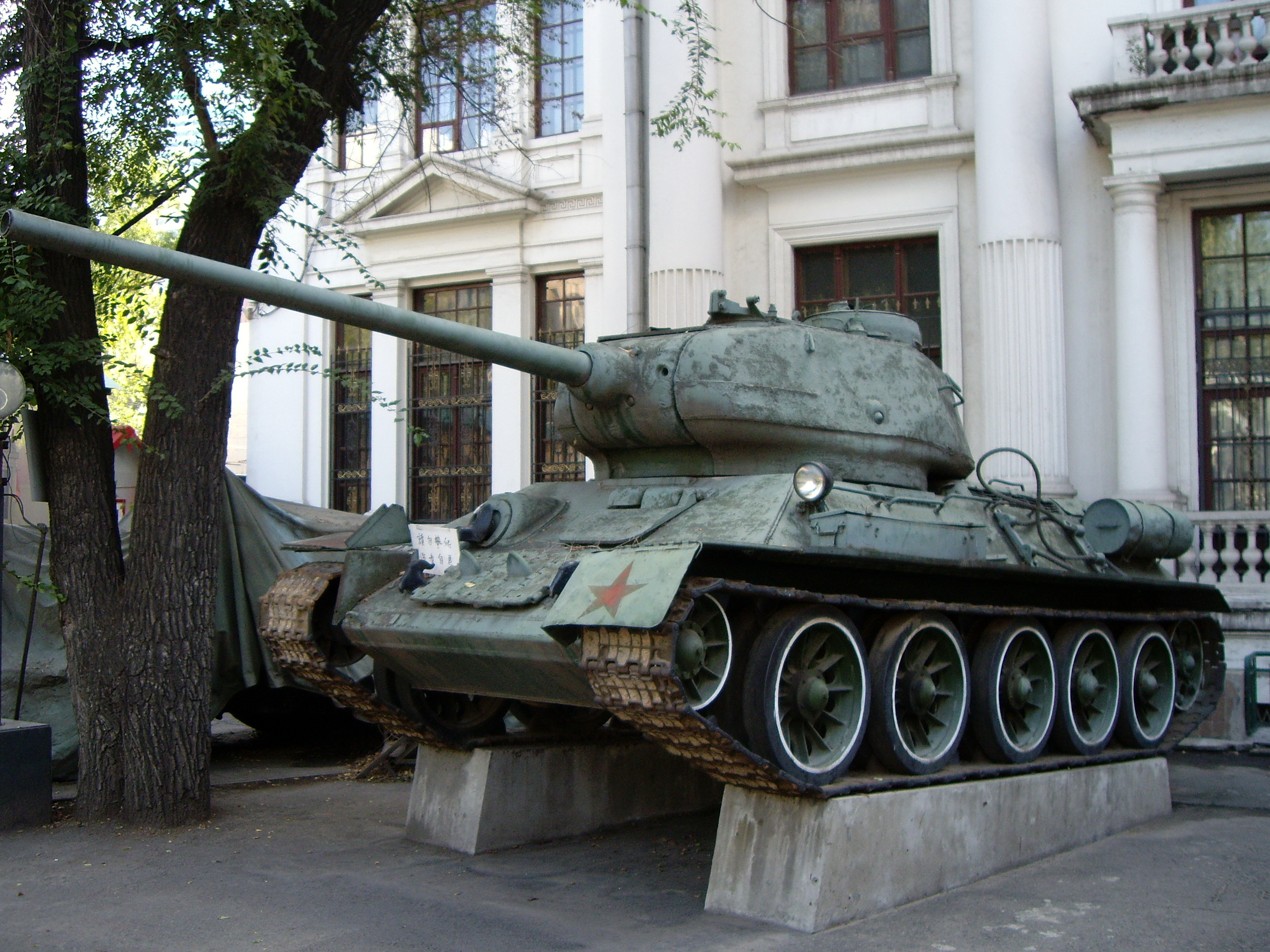
Chinese modified T-34-85

==== Tanks ====
Although there have been many modifications that have resulted in some visual differences between original T-34-85 and the Chinese T-34-85, and although the Chinese factory 617 had the ability to produce every single part of T-34-85, there was not a single T-34-85 that was actually produced in China.

==== Self-propelled anti-aircraft guns ====
- Type 63 was a T-34-76 Obr.1943 produced by UralVagonZavod and converted into an anti-aircraft vehicle, which was armed with Chinese twin 37 mm Type 61 AA guns.
- Type 65 was a T-34-85 proceeded similar modification as Type 63. One was captured by US forces in Vietnam and survives today.

=== Poland ===
==== Tanks ====
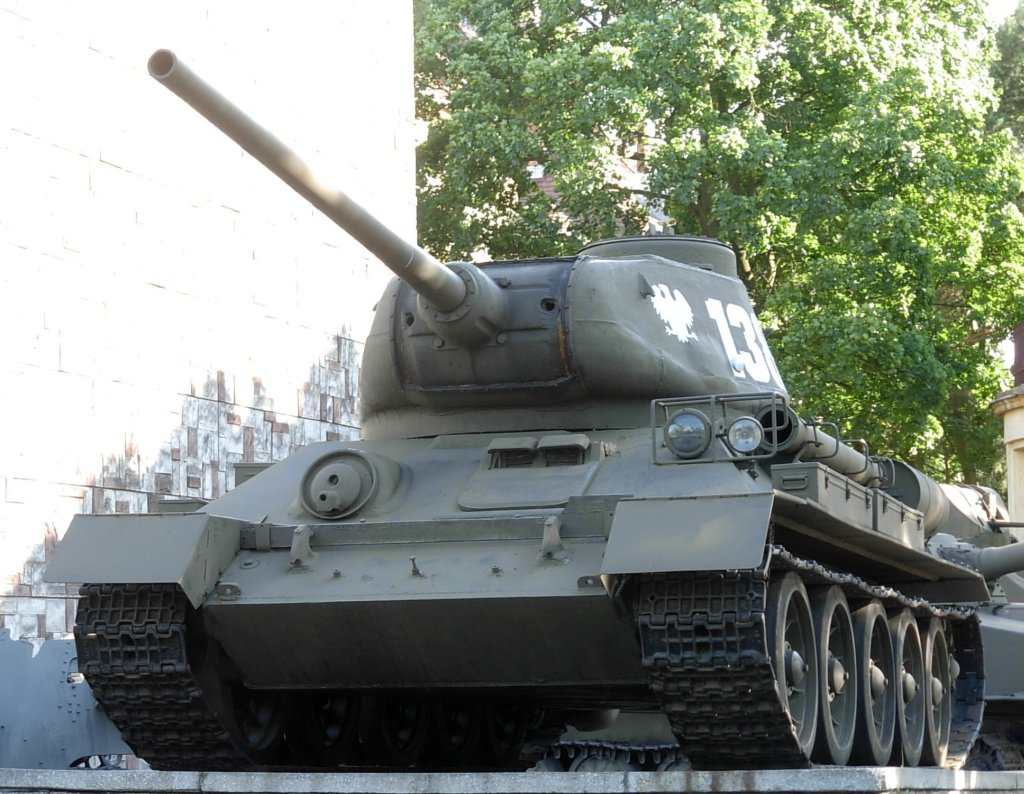
T-34-85M2.

- T-34-85M1 - This unit was a product of the Polish refurbishing program. Similar to Soviet Model 1960, it added 'skeleton' roadwheels.
  - T-34-85M2 - The Polish refurbishing program produced this tank, similar to Soviet Model 1969, by adding exterior storage, a deep-wading kit and a snorkel.

==== Support vehicles ====
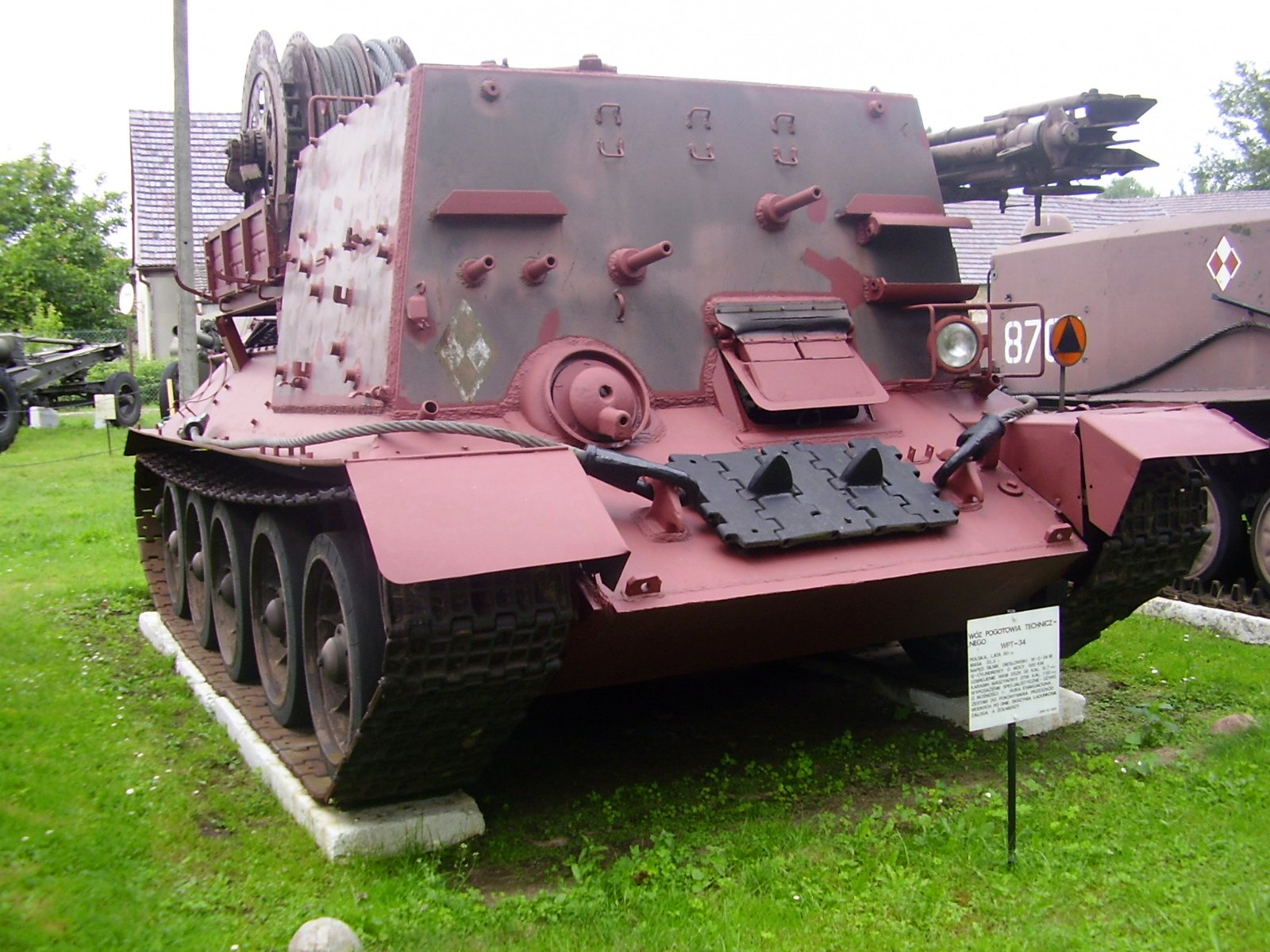
WPT-34

- CW-34 is a Polish derivative of VT-34.
- WPT-34 (1960s) - This was a Polish repair and maintenance vehicle with a superstructure replacing the turret, a crane, a large-diameter telescoping snorkel for deep fording operations as well as a large-spade type earth anchor in the rear. It was converted from T-34 tanks as well as SU-85 and SU-100 tank destroyers.

=== Romania ===
==== Tanks ====
- T-34 with 120/150 mm gun – In 1942, the Kingdom of Romania had captured many Soviet vehicles, among them being two T-34s. One of them weighed 32 tonnes and was up-armored (STZ variant). It was proposed to modify those vehicles to make them more effective by mounting 120 and 150 mm guns on them. The project was scrapped because the needed recoil parts for said guns were not available in Romania at the time. Also, it would have been needed to equip the vehicles with new turrets, which the Romanian industry was not able to produce. Romania, however, made other similar conversions during the war, namely the Mareșal, TACAM T-60, TACAM R-2 and Vânătorul de care R35, which all used captured Soviet parts (either chassis or guns).
- T-34-85 tanks were modernized in 1959: they were made amphibious for depths of up to 5 m; were equipped with gyrocompasses; were equipped with preheaters for water and oil; had the Soviet 9RS radio changed to a Czechoslovak RM-31T one; and underwent other improvements.

=== Syria ===
==== Tanks ====
- T-34/55 - This unit was a Syrian modernization of Soviet-made T-34-85s earlier upgraded for export by Czechoslovakia, adding an anti-aircraft machine gun fitted to the commander's cupola and other upgrades.

==== Self-propelled howitzers ====
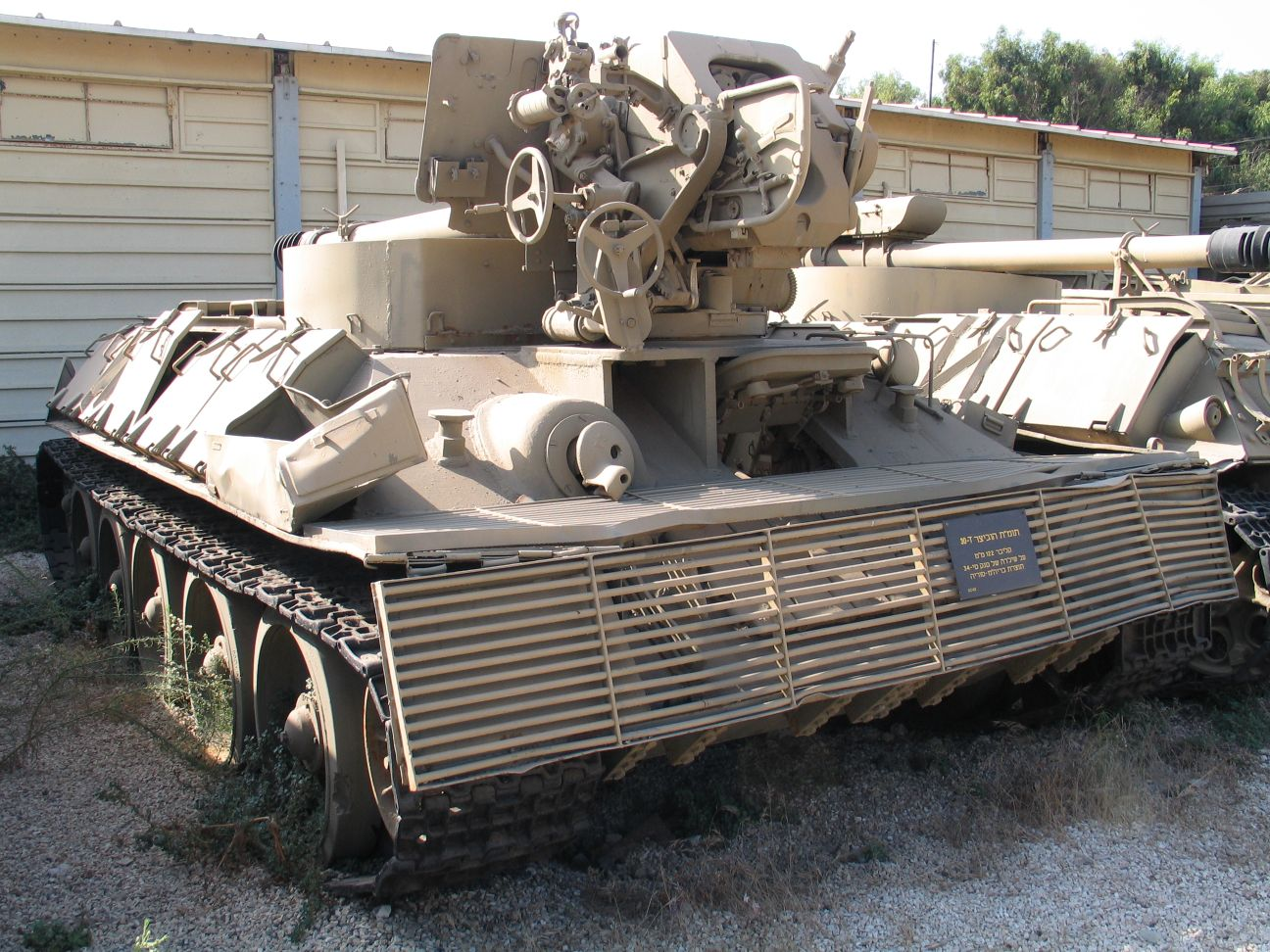
Ex-Syrian T-34/122 SPH in Batey ha-Osef Museum, Tel Aviv, Israel, 2005

- T-34/122 This Syrian conversion is a self-propelled howitzer armed with a 122 mm D-30 howitzer. The gun is facing backwards to preserve the center of gravity. The mount is completely open apart from a mantlet around the base of the gun tube. The rear of the mount includes a folding platform on which the gun crew works when firing the howitzer. While the vehicle is moving the platform is folded to avoid blocking the driver's vision.

=== Former Yugoslavia ===
==== Tanks ====
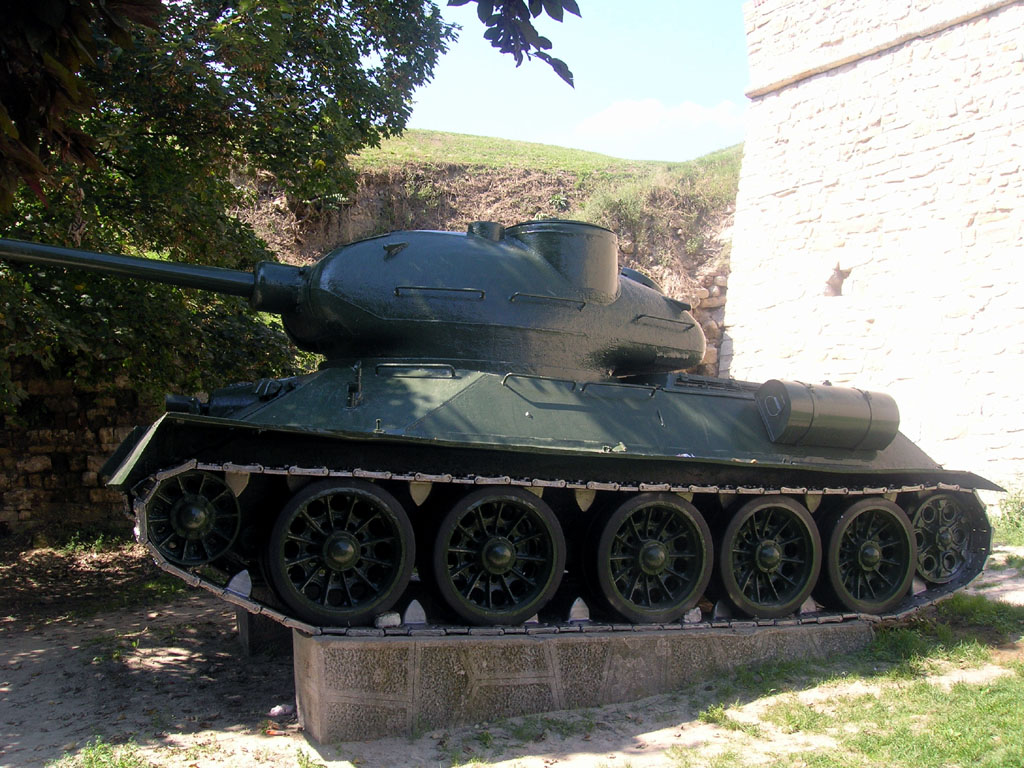
Yugoslav Teski Tank Vozilo A on display at the military museum in the Kalemegdan fortress in Belgrade

- Teski Tenk Vozilo A (Heavy Tank Type A) - This was a 1949 Yugoslav tank based on the T-34 design. A total of nine prototypes were built. They were designed and built at the height of the danger from Soviet invasion when Yugoslavia was building up its weapons industry. They were designed by reverse engineering of the Soviet T-34-85 medium tank without any documentation. They are recognizable by their angled front hull corners, modified hull machine gun mantlet, streamlined turret with cylindrical cupola, muzzle brake on the gun, and external fuel tanks that appear to be notched to fit the hull. An alternate version existed, armed with a gun and a mantlet from the M47 Patton. Two examples survive. One of the prototypes is on display at the military museum in the Kalemegdan fortress in Belgrade. The other surviving example is in Banja Luka barracks.
- T-34B A Yugoslav T-34-85 fitted with an extra 12.7mm M2 Browning machine gun on top of the turret, an improved chassis based on the T-55, and a Night Vision device. Appliqué armor and rubber sheets were usually added to the sides of the turret and hull during the Yugoslav wars.

== See also ==
- Tank classification
- Armoured fighting vehicle classification

== Notes ==
Media related to T-34 variants at Wikimedia Commons
