= Grigory Kulik =

Marshal of the Soviet Union

Grigory Ivanovich Kulik
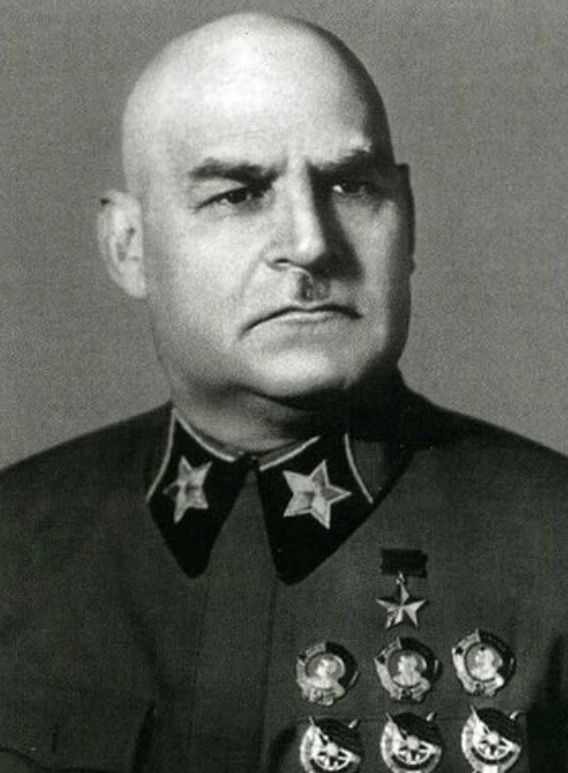
- Kulik c. 1940s
- Born: 9 November 1890; Dudnikovo, Poltava Governorate, Russian Empire (now Ukraine)
- Died: 24 August 1950 (aged 59); Moscow, Russian SFSR, Soviet Union
- Burial place: Donskoi Cemetery
- Military career
- Allegiance: Russian Empire (1912–1917); Russian SFSR (1918–1922); Soviet Union (1922–1946)
- Service years: 1912–1946
- Rank: Marshal of the Soviet Union (1940–1942)
- Commands: Main Artillery Directorate
- Conflicts: World War I; Russian Civil War; Polish–Soviet War; Spanish Civil War; World War II; Winter War; Eastern Front
- Awards: Hero of the Soviet Union

Grigory Ivanovich Kulik (Russian: Григорий Иванович Кулик; Ukrainian: Григорій Іванович Кулик, romanized: Hryhorii Ivanovych Kulyk; 9 November 1890 – 24 August 1950) was a Soviet military commander and Marshal of the Soviet Union who served as chief of the Red Army's Main Artillery Directorate from 1937 until June 1941.

Born into a Ukrainian peasant family near Poltava, Kulik served as an artillery officer in the Imperial Russian Army during the First World War. On the outbreak of the Russian Revolution, he joined the Bolsheviks and the Red Army. He fought alongside Joseph Stalin at the Battle of Tsaritsyn during the Russian Civil War and quickly became one of Stalin's most favoured generals. In 1937, he was named chief of the Main Artillery Directorate. Kulik had a highly conservative outlook in military technology and theory. He was a strong opponent to Marshal Mikhail Tukhachevsky's reforms and his deep operations theory, and dismissed innovations such as the T-34 and KV-1 tanks and the Katyusha rocket artillery system.

Kulik was named First Deputy People's Commissar for Defence in 1939, and later took part in the Soviet invasion of Poland. In 1940, he was named a Marshal of the Soviet Union. Kulik's poor leadership during the Winter War in Finland and the German invasion of the Soviet Union led to his fall from grace. He was dismissed from his Artillery Directorate in late 1941, and in early 1942 he was court-martialed and demoted to major-general, but escaped execution thanks to his good relations with Stalin.

After the war, Stalin and Lavrentiy Beria began a new round of purges. Kulik was arrested for treason in 1947 and remained in prison until 1950, when Stalin ordered his execution.

== Early life ==
Kulik was born into a peasant family of Ukrainian origin near Poltava. A soldier of the Imperial Russian Army in World War I, he served as a non-commissioned officer in the artillery. In 1917 he joined the Bolshevik Party and the Red Army during 1918.

== Civil war ==
At the beginning of the Russian Civil War, his friendship with the Bolshevik Kliment Voroshilov caused him to join the Red Army, resulting in an introduction to Stalin and the command of the artillery of the 1st Cavalry Army (co-led by Stalin and Voroshilov) at the Battle of Tsaritsyn during 1918.

The position was almost entirely political in nature, a reward for Kulik joining the Reds and his loyalty to Voroshilov; Kulik himself did not have any experience with gun laying or commanding artillery crews, and the whole Bolshevik artillery force in Tsaritsyn consisted of 3 obsolete artillery pieces. Despite having little to no perceivable effect on the outcome of the battle, Kulik's performance greatly impressed Stalin.

After the Civil War, Kulik continued as one of Stalin's favored and most politically reliable generals during Poland's 1919 invasion of the Soviet Union, which he commanded personally. His poor performance resulted in him being replaced by the former cavalry NCO Semyon Budyonny. Unfazed, Stalin promoted Kulik to the post of First Deputy People's Commissar for Defense directed by Voroshilov.

== Artillery Directorate Chief ==
In 1937, Kulik was appointed chief of the Main Artillery Directorate, making him responsible for overseeing the development and production of new tanks, tank guns and artillery pieces.

Kulik retained his opinions of the Red Army as it was during 1918, the last time he had had a field command. He denounced Marshal Mikhail Tukhachevsky's campaign to redevelop the Red Army's mechanized forces into independent units like the Wehrmacht's Panzerkorps; the creation of separate divisions allowed them to use their greater maneuverability for Deep Battle-style maneuver warfare, rapidly exploiting breakthroughs rather than simply assisting the infantry. Correctly sensing that Stalin considered these new ideas as potential threats to his authority, Kulik successfully argued against the change.

In an anonymous section of a report on the Spanish Civil War, Kulik noted that tanks not facing anti-tank weaponry were effective on the battlefield. He and Voroshilov argued that Tukhachevsky's theoretical style of warfare could not yet be carried out by the Red Army in its pre-war state, even if those theories were effective. Though Tukhachevsky was purged in 1937 because of Stalin and Voroshilov's dislike for him, his theories were at that time already widely influential in the Red Army. Though Kulik and Voroshilov's reforms moved the Red Army further away from deep operations doctrine, which had fallen out of favor due to many of its proponents being purged, as well as a lack of officers able to carry out the complicated operations required, the adjustment of Soviet military theory to better reflect the Red Army's actual operational capability would have a positive impact on the performance of the army in the opening days of World War II. Marshal Georgi Zhukov's use of deep operations techniques to great effect in Manchuria against the Japanese would eventually convince Stalin of their value, after which they were used effectively during Operation Bagration.

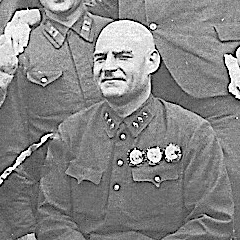
Grigory Kulik 1936

Kulik criticized Marshal Voroshilov's endorsement of the production of the T-34 tank and his namesake KV-1 tanks, both of which would prove instrumental to the survival of the USSR. After Kulik was overruled by Stalin and ordered to produce the tanks anyway, he began deliberately delaying the production of ammunition and guns, resulting in a drastic shortage of 76.2mm shells. At the start of the war, no more than 12% of T-34 and KV-1 tanks had a full ammunition load; few had any anti-tank rounds, most had no more than a few high explosive shells, and a shocking number had to rely solely on their coaxial machine guns, having no 76.2mm rounds at all. Many T-34 and KV-1 tanks were sent into battle underarmed and eventually had to be abandoned by their crews when they ran out of ammunition.

Prior to and during the early period of the war with Germany, Kulik interfered with the armament of the T-34 and KV-1 tanks. Though it was both more effective and cheaper than the L-11 gun then in use, Kulik opposed the adoption of the F-34 gun designed by Vasiliy Grabin's workshop at the Joseph Stalin Factory No. 92, as he was a political patron for the Leningrad Kirov Plant, which manufactured the L-11. Due to his status, the relevant armament bureaucrats failed to approve the newer gun for fear of retaliation. This eventually necessitated a rushed retrofit of the KV-1 and T-34's gun in the midst of the German invasion when it became apparent that the L-11 could not reliably penetrate even the lightly armored Panzer III, which was arriving in large numbers. This was facilitated by Grabin's disobedience; with the endorsement of Kulik's political enemies, he had secretly ordered the manufacture of a reserve stock of F-34 guns, predicting that they would soon be needed and that his decision would be lauded by Stalin once the gun had proven itself in battle. Grabin was correct; Kulik's objections were outweighed by the many letters from Soviet tank crewmen to Stalin endorsing the new gun.

Kulik also disparaged the use of minefields as a defensive measure, considering this to be at odds with a properly aggressive strategy and terming minefields "a weapon of the weak." This decision allowed for the essentially free movement of German forces across Russian defensive lines during Operation Barbarossa, with static defensive strongpoints being bypassed easily by Panzer spearheads and were surrounded by infantry, forcing the defenders to surrender. He also zealously endorsed Stalin's exhortations against retreat, allowing whole divisions to be encircled and annihilated or starved into surrendering en masse. Eventually, after Kulik's demotion, the laying of multiple layers of anti-tank mines proved instrumental for both the successful defense of Leningrad during the German siege and the successful defensive actions against much stronger German armored forces at the Battle of Kursk.

Kulik similarly scorned the German issue of the MP-40 submachine gun to their shock troops, stating that it encouraged inaccuracy and excessive ammunition consumption among the rank and file. He forbade the issue of the submachine gun PPD-40 to his units, stating that it was only suitable as a police weapon. It was not until 1941, after widespread demand for a weapon to match the MP-40 again overruled Kulik's restrictions, that a simple modification of the manufacturing process for the PPD-40 produced the PPSh-41, which proved to be amongst the most widely produced, inexpensive and effective small arms of the war, considered by many German infantrymen to be superior to the MP-40, with whole companies of Russian infantrymen eventually being issued the weapon for house-to-house fighting.

Kulik refused to endorse the production of the innovative Katyusha rocket artillery system, stating "What the hell do we need rocket artillery for? The main thing is the horse-drawn gun." Although it could have been produced much earlier in the war without his meddling, the Katyusha rocket artillery system eventually proved to be one of the most effective Soviet inventions of the war and a major advance in artillery technology.

In 1939 he became Deputy People's Commissar of Defense, also participating with the Soviet occupation of Eastern Poland in September. He commanded the Soviet's artillery attack on Finland at the start of the Winter War, which quickly foundered.

On 5 May 1940, Kulik's wife Kira Kulik-Simonich was kidnapped on Stalin's orders, unknown to Kulik and for an uncertain reason. Kira, a mother to an eight-year old girl, was subsequently executed by NKVD executioner Vasili Blokhin in June 1940. It appears that Stalin then ordered the modern equivalent of a damnatio memoriae against the hapless woman; although she was described as very pretty, no photographs or other images of her survive. Two days later, on 7 May 1940, Kulik was promoted to Marshal of the Soviet Union. Although the public search for Kira continued for 12 years, he soon married again.

Years after his appointment as Chief of Artillery (and his poor performance in two separate wars), Nikita Khrushchev questioned his competence, causing Stalin to rebuke him angrily: "You don't even know Kulik! I know him from the civil war when he commanded the artillery in Tsaritsyn. He knows artillery!"

== World War II ==
After the Soviet invasion of Poland, according to initial Red Army figures, over 450,000 Polish prisoners of war were taken into Soviet captivity. As deputy defense minister Kulik proposed initially to immediately release ethnic Ukrainian and Belarusian prisoners, apart from officers, this was done between 23–25 September 1939. Stalin was undecided about what to do with the rest of the prisoners and discussed the issue with his closest advisors. Kulik proposed freeing them all, a sentiment which Marshal Kliment Voroshilov shared. Senior political commissar Lev Mekhlis insisted that there were enemies among them but Kulik persisted and Stalin compromised. The Polish prisoners were released except for the officers whose execution was finally ordered at the Politburo on 5 March 1940. In April–May 1940, 26,000 officers were executed by Lavrentiy Beria's NKVD (many by Blokhin) in the Katyn Massacre.

When Germany invaded the USSR during June 1941, Kulik was given command of the 54th Army on the Leningrad front. Here he presided over Soviet defeats that resulted in the city of Leningrad being surrounded and General Georgi Zhukov being rushed to the front in order to stabilize the defenses and take over Kulik's command.

Zhukov states Kulik "was relieved of his command, and the Stavka placed the 54th Army under the Leningrad Front" on 29 September 1941. On June 22, the Defense Industries and the Artillery Directorate were transferred away from Kulik to a 32-year-old factory director, Dmitriy Ustinov. During March 1942 Kulik was court-martialed and demoted to the rank of major-general. His status as one of Stalin's cronies saved him from the firing squad that was the fate of other defeated Soviet generals. During April 1943 he became commander of the 4th Guards Army. From 1944 to 1945 he was Deputy Head of the Directory of Mobilization, and deputy commander of the Volga Military District.

== Downfall and death ==
After a respite during and immediately after the war, Stalin and his police chief Lavrentiy Beria began a new round of military purges due to Stalin's jealousy and suspicion of the generals' public standing. Kulik was dismissed from his posts during 1946 after NKVD telephone eavesdroppers overheard him grumbling that politicians were stealing the credit from the generals. Arrested during 1947, he remained in prison until 1950, when he was condemned to death and executed for treason.
