= 76 mm tank gun M1940 F-34 =

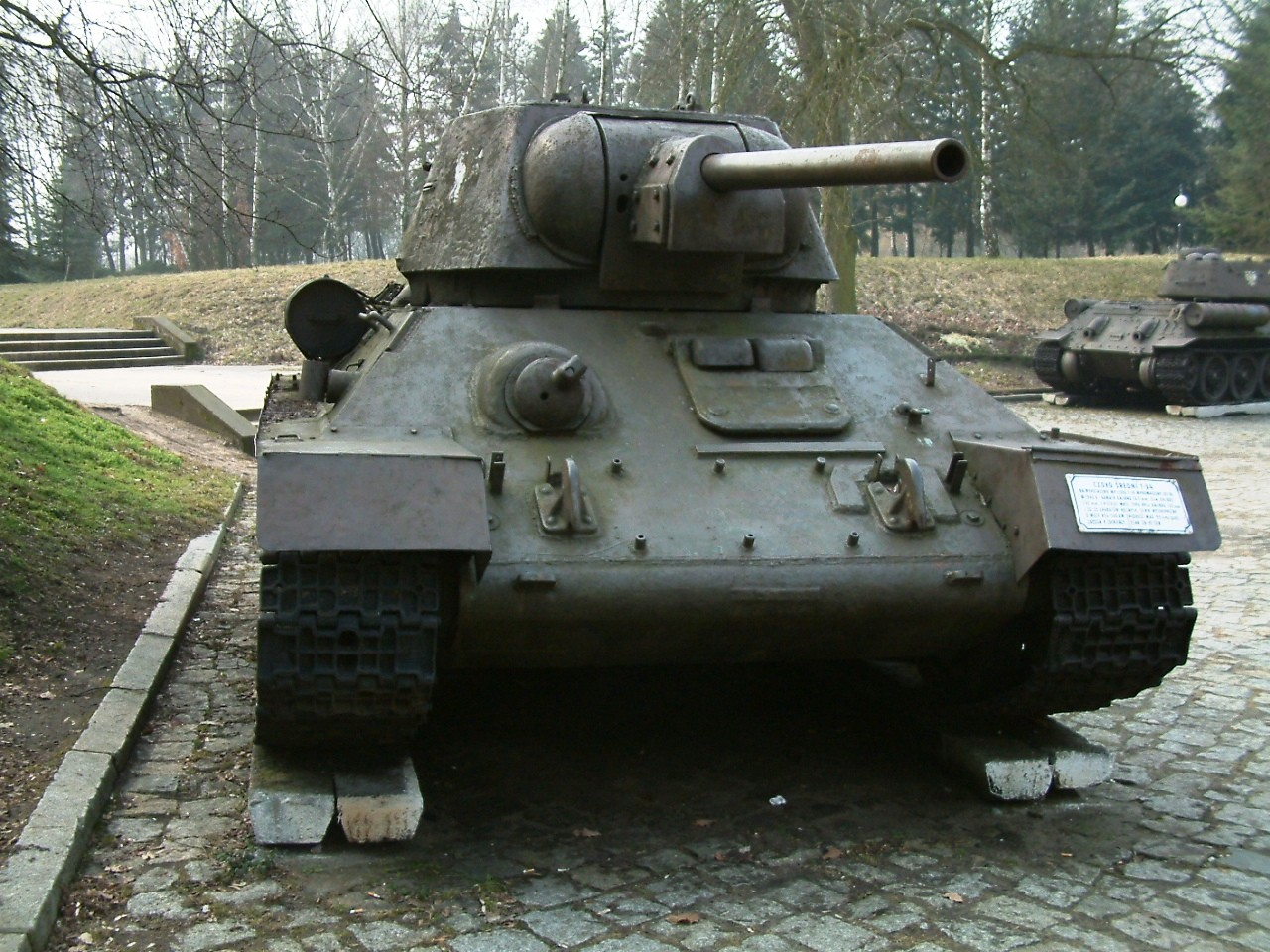
- The F-34 was the standard gun on the T-34 medium tank. Shown here is a T-34 Model 1943.
- Type: Tank gun
- Place of origin: Soviet Union

Service history
- Used by: Soviet Union; Nazi Germany
- Wars: World War II

Production history
- Designer: P. Muraviev
- Designed: 1939
- Manufacturer: Factory No. 92
- Produced: 1940

Specifications
- Barrel length: 3.2 m (10 ft 6 in) L/42.5
- Shell: Fixed QF 76.2 × 385 mm. R
- Shell weight: 6.5 kg (14 lb 5 oz)
- Caliber: 76.2 mm (3.00 in)
- Breech: Semi-automatic vertical sliding-wedge
- Elevation: 5° to 32°
- Traverse: 360°
- Rate of fire: 5-10 rpm
- Muzzle velocity: 680 m/s (2,200 ft/s)
- Maximum firing range: 2.0 km (1.2 mi)(effective 800m)

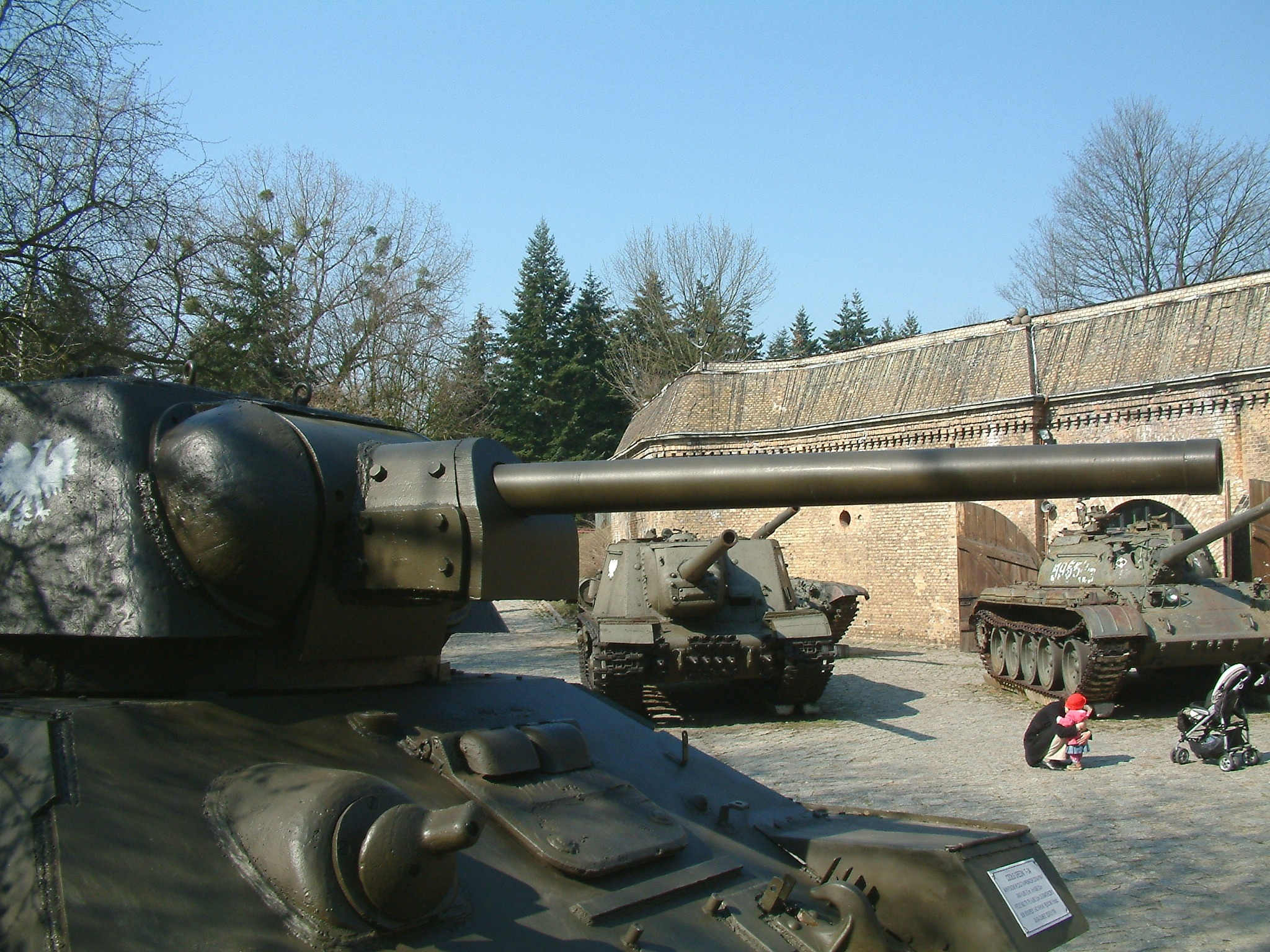
Side view

The 76 mm tank gun M1940 F-34 (76-мм танковая пушка обр. 1940 г. Ф-34) was a 76.2 mm Soviet tank gun used on the T-34/76 tank. A modified version of the gun, the 76 mm tank gun M1941 ZiS-5 (76-мм танковая пушка обр. 1941 г. ЗиС-5), was used on KV-1 tanks during World War II. Nowadays, the two versions are often referred to just by their factory designations, as "F-34" and "ZiS-5", respectively.

== History ==
The F-34 was designed before the start of World War II by P. Muraviev of Vasiliy Grabin's design bureau at Factory No. 92 in Gorky. The gun was superior to both contemporary 76.2 mm guns, Gorky's F-32 and the Leningrad Kirov Plant's L-11, but it was the latter that had already been approved for the new T-34 medium tank. The initial T-34 Model 1940 with L-11 was in production when Germany invaded the Soviet Union.

The F-34 was ready for production, but Marshal Grigory Kulik's high-handed interference with tank appropriation had made the relevant bureaucrats too fearful of being arrested to approve the better gun. Grabin and the director of the Kharkov Locomotive Factory (KhPZ), the centre of T-34 production, conspired to produce the F-34 anyway, and began to install the gun on new tanks. The new T-34 Model 1941 tanks, which were issued mostly to company and platoon commanders, were immensely popular with their crews. Letters from tank units reached Stalin's State Defense Committee (GKO), which officially authorized production.

Also, due to Kulik's meddling, the KV-1 heavy tank Model 1940 had ended up mounting Grabin's older F-32 gun, making it more poorly armed than the T-34 medium tank. Chief Designer of Tanks Joseph Kotin convinced the GKO to allow the use of the F-34 gun on the KV-1 heavy tank Model 1941. The ZiS-5 was a version of the gun designed to better fit the KV-1's turret.

In 1943, the thick armor of the new German Tiger and Panther tanks had rendered the F-34 gun obsolete, and experiments were conducted to find a replacement. The better-penetrating 57 mm ZiS-2 high velocity antitank gun was installed on some T-34/57 tanks, but the smaller-bored gun couldn't fire an adequate high-explosive round for general use. A more heavily armoured T-34 prototype was built, the T-43, but it was still vulnerable to the Tiger's 88, and its mobility suffered too much from the weight of armour.

In the end, the F-34 was replaced by the D-5T and ZiS-S-53 85 mm calibre guns on the T-34-85 tank, and by 122mm and 152 mm guns on the new IS-2 heavy tank and in the casemate-type heavy assault guns SU-152 and ISU-152.

== Comparison of guns ==
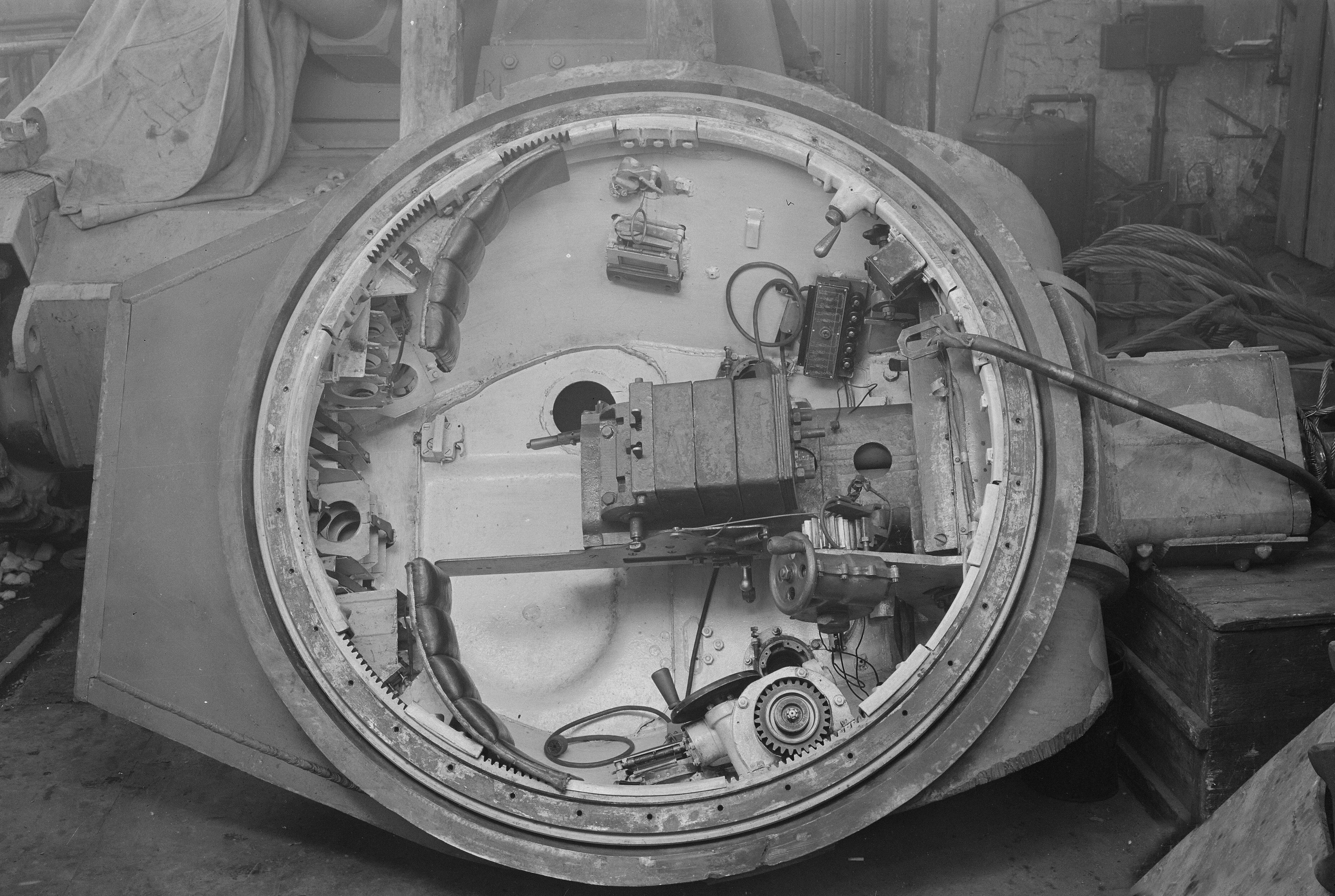
Interior of T-34 Model 1941 turret, with F-34 gun visible. The vehicle was captured by the Finnish Army and is undergoing overhaul. Photo taken in 1944.

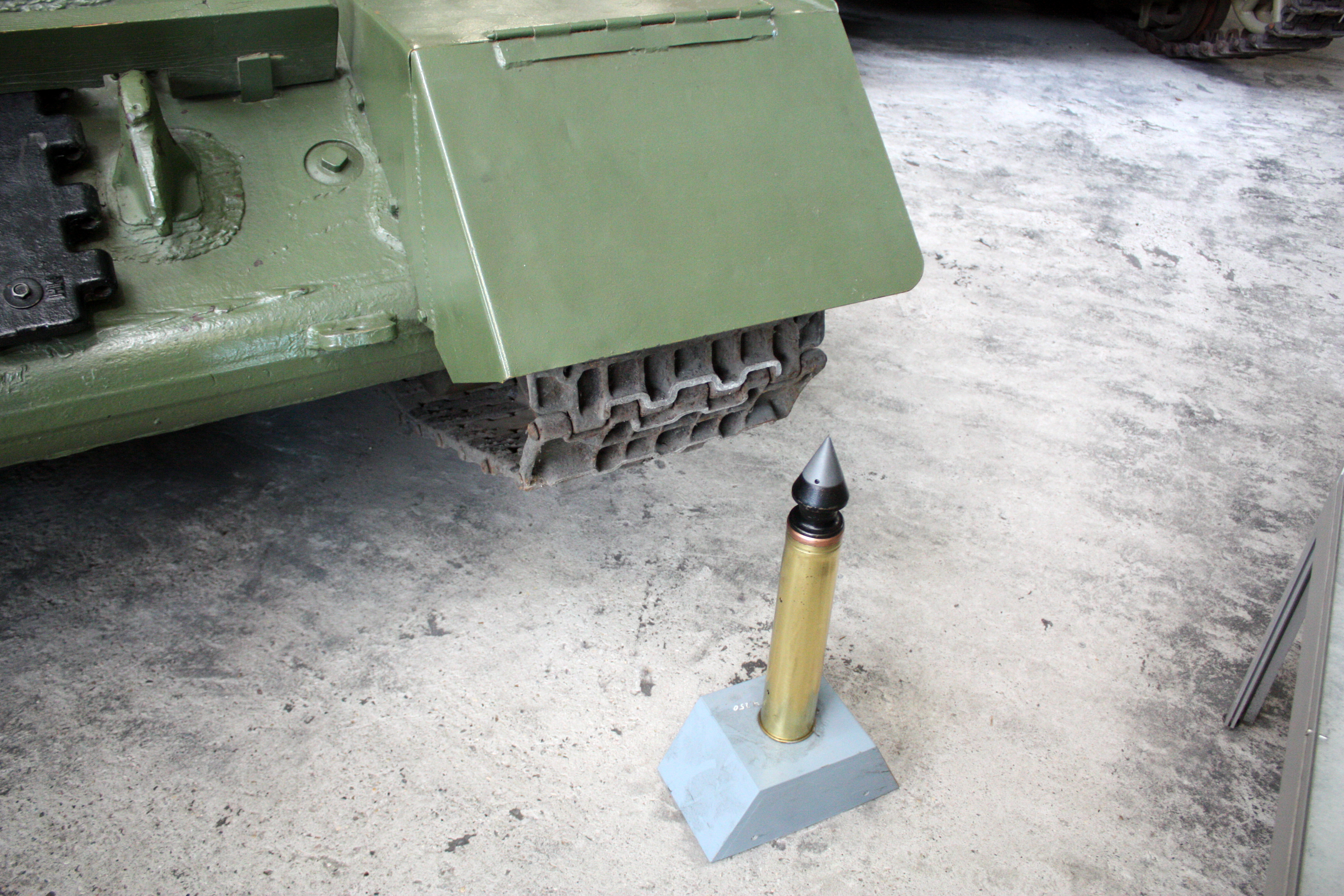
BR-354P APCR round

The L-11 gun was mounted on the initial T-34 Model 1940 medium tank and the KV-1 Model 1939 heavy tank. The F-32 was on the KV-1 Model 1940. Subsequent models of both tanks mounted the F-34 until it was replaced by 85mm guns in the T-34-85 medium tank and KV-85 heavy tank.

Comparison of Soviet 76.2mm guns and ammunition
Gun	L-11	F-32	F-34
Length (calibres)	L/30.5	L/31.5	L/41.5
F-354 high explosive (HE)
weight (kg)	6.23	6.23	6.23
muzzle velocity (m/s)	610	613	680
OF-350 high explosive fragmentation (HE-Frag)
weight (kg)	6.21	6.21	6.21
muzzle velocity (m/s)	610	638	680
BR-353A high explosive anti-tank (HEAT)
weight (kg)	3.9	3.9	3.9
muzzle velocity (m/s)	?	?	325
penetration (mm)	75	75	75
Armour-piercing (AP)
weight (kg)	6.51	6.51	6.3
muzzle velocity (m/s)	612	613	680
penetration at 500 m (mm)	?	60	?
penetration at 1,000 m (mm)	50	50	60
BR-350/BR-350A armour-piercing high explosive (APHE)
weight (kg)	6.3	6.3	6.3
muzzle velocity (m/s)	612	613	655
penetration at 500 m (mm)	62	?	69
penetration at 1,000 m (mm)	56	?	61
BR-350P armour-piercing, composite rigid (APCR)
weight (kg)	?	?	3.0
muzzle velocity (m/s)	?	?	965
penetration at 500 m (mm)	?	?	92
penetration at 1,000 m (mm)	?	?	60

== See also ==
=== Weapons of comparable role, performance and era ===
- Ordnance QF 75 mm – Contemporary British tank gun
- 7.5 cm KwK 40 – Contemporary German tank gun
- 75 mm Gun M2/M3/M6 – Contemporary US tank gun
