= L-11 76.2 mm tank gun =

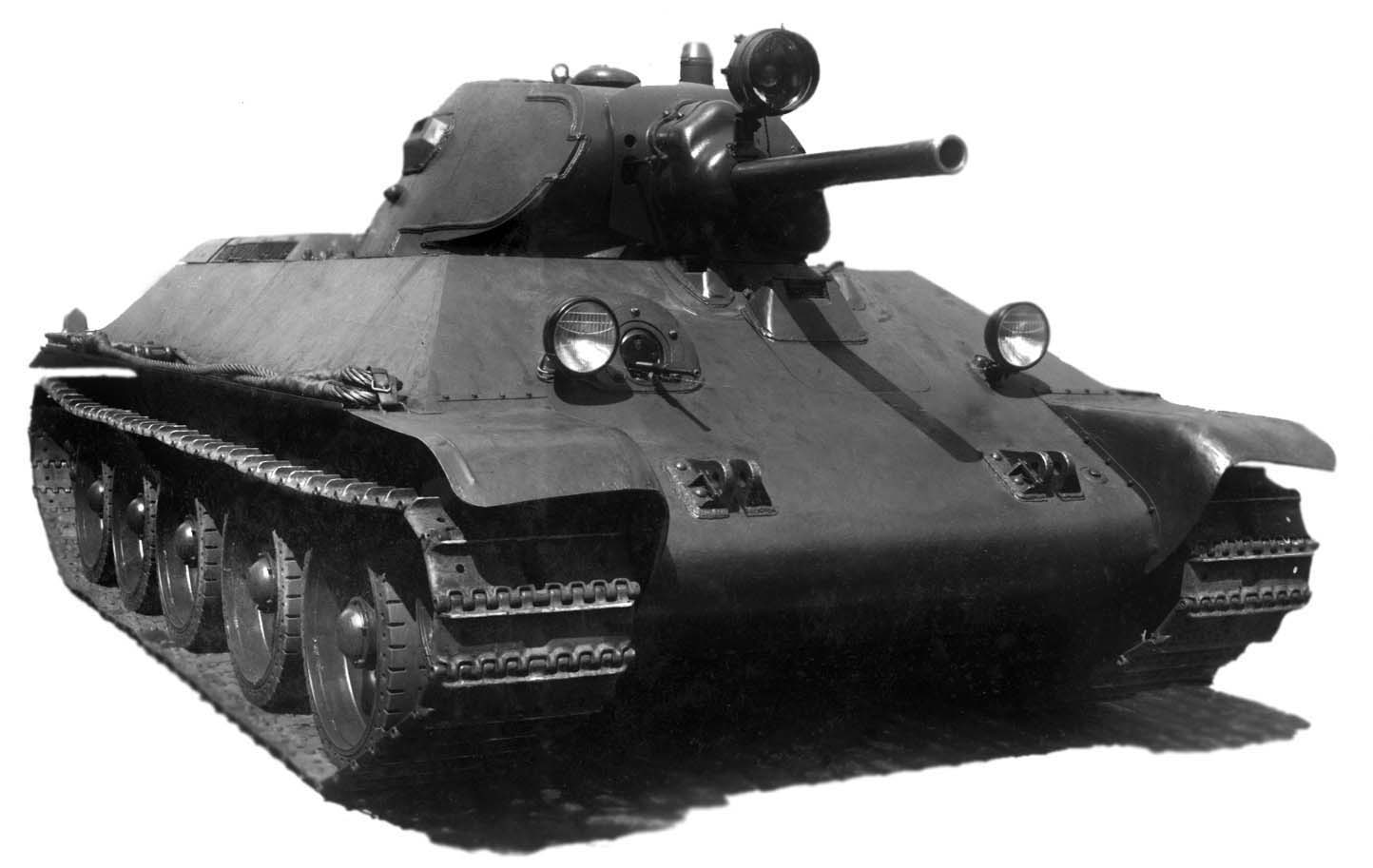
- T-34 Model 1940 with L-11 gun
- Type: Tank gun
- Place of origin: Soviet Union

Service history
- Used by: Soviet Union; Nazi Germany
- Wars: World War II

Production history
- Designer: IA Makhanov
- Designed: 1938
- Manufacturer: Kirov Plant
- Produced: 1939–1941
- Variants: See variants

Specifications
- Barrel length: 2.3 m (7 ft 7 in) L/30.5
- Shell: Fixed QF 76.2 × 385 mm. R
- Shell weight: 6.5 kg (14 lb 5 oz)
- Caliber: 76.2 mm (3.00 in)
- Breech: Semi-automatic vertical sliding-wedge
- Recoil: Hydro-pneumatic
- Elevation: 2° to 25°
- Traverse: 360°
- Rate of fire: 6-7 rpm
- Muzzle velocity: 613 m/s (2,010 ft/s)
- Maximum firing range: 5.6 km (3.5 mi)

The 76.2 mm tank gun M1938/39 (L-11) was a Soviet tank gun, used on the earliest models of the T-34 Model 1940 medium tank and KV-1 Model 1939 heavy tank during World War II.

== History ==
The L-11 was designed in 1938 by IA Makhanov of the SKB-4 design bureau at the Kirov Plant in Leningrad. It was 30.5 calibers long, had a semi-automatic vertical sliding-wedge breech, used fixed quick-fire 76.2 x 385 mm R ammunition and had a hydro-pneumatic recoil mechanism.

It has been claimed that the L-11 was based on the 76 mm air-defense gun M1914/15 designed by VV Tarnovsky and F. F. Lender. What can be said is that both the M1914/15 and L-11 had similar lengths, similar muzzle velocities (592 m/s vs 613 m/s), were built in the same factory and fired the same ammunition.

Through a combination of administrative interference by Marshal Grigory Kulik and bureaucratic inertia, the first models of the T-34 and KV-1 were both armed with the L-11. Testing of both tanks highlighted an undesirable situation where both a medium tank and heavy tank were equal in firepower and neither had the firepower necessary to defeat a foreign tank of similar capabilities. Although an acceptable tank gun by the standards of the time the L-11 did not have a substantial performance advantage over foreign designs. Therefore, the L-11 was a stopgap until improved guns for the T-34 and KV-1 could be produced. An early favorite to replace the L-11 was a modified version of the 76 mm air defense gun M1931, but delays and difficulties saw it passed over despite excellent performance.

During 1941 the L-11 was replaced on T-34 production lines by the 42.5 caliber F-34 and on KV-1 production lines by the 31.5 caliber F-32. Despite being considered a superior design the performance of the F-32 gun was not substantially better than the L-11 and inferior to the F-34 gun used on the T-34. Eventually, the F-32 gun was replaced on the KV-1 production lines by a modified version of the F-34 gun called the ZiS-5, finally giving the T-34 and KV-1 parity in firepower.

== Comparison of guns ==
Comparison of Soviet 76.2mm guns and ammunition
Gun	Model	L-11	F-32	F-34
Gun	Length (calibres)	L/30.5	L/31.5	L/42.5
F-534 high explosive (HE)	weight (kg)	6.23	6.23	6.23
F-534 high explosive (HE)	muzzle velocity (m/s)	610	613	680
OF-350 high explosive fragmentation (HE-Frag)	weight (kg)	6.21	6.21	6.21
OF-350 high explosive fragmentation (HE-Frag)	muzzle velocity (m/s)	610	638	680
BP-353A high explosive anti-tank (HEAT)	weight (kg)	3.9	3.9	3.9
BP-353A high explosive anti-tank (HEAT)	muzzle velocity (m/s)	?	?	325
BP-353A high explosive anti-tank (HEAT)	penetration (mm)	75	75	75
Armour-piercing (AP)	weight (kg)	6.51	6.51	6.3
Armour-piercing (AP)	muzzle velocity (m/s)	612	613	680
Armour-piercing (AP)	penetration at 500 m (mm)	?	60	?
Armour-piercing (AP)	penetration at 1,000 m (mm)	50	50	60
BR-350/BR-350A armour-piercing high explosive (APHE)	weight (kg)	6.3	6.3	6.3
BR-350/BR-350A armour-piercing high explosive (APHE)	muzzle velocity (m/s)	612	613	655
BR-350/BR-350A armour-piercing high explosive (APHE)	penetration at 500 m (mm)	62	?	69
BR-350/BR-350A armour-piercing high explosive (APHE)	penetration at 1,000 m (mm)	56	?	61
BR-350P armour-piercing, composite rigid (APCR)	weight (kg)	?	?	3.0
BR-350P armour-piercing, composite rigid (APCR)	muzzle velocity (m/s)	?	?	965
BR-350P armour-piercing, composite rigid (APCR)	penetration at 500 m (mm)	?	?	92
BR-350P armour-piercing, composite rigid (APCR)	penetration at 1,000 m (mm)	?	?	60

== Variants ==
=== L-17 casemate gun ===
During the 1930s the Red Army proposed creation of a new 76 mm casemate gun capable of withstanding a direct hit from a 76 mm armor-piercing projectile fired from a distance of 400 m (1,300 ft) or the explosion of a 203 mm (8.0 in) high-explosive projectile at a distance of 1 m (3 ft 3 in) from the pillbox.

The design bureau of the Kirov Plant under the leadership of IA Makhanov responded by creating a variant of the L-11 which it called the L-17. The L-17 was mounted in a heavily armored gun mantlet with the barrel inside of an armored tube. In May 1939, the Kirov plant received an order for six-hundred L-17 guns. During testing between September 29 and October 8, 1939 the L-17 withstood the impact of a 76 mm armor piercing projectile fired from a M1902/30 field gun at a velocity of 529–547 m (1,736–1,795 ft) at a distance of 50 m (160 ft). The first L-17's were installed in June 1940 in the Kamenets-Podilsky fortified area.

=== Field gun conversion ===
During 1941-1942 a field gun based on the L-11 was introduced. It consisted of an L-11 barrel on the split-trail carriage used by the ZiS-3. This adaptation was probably done to address the huge losses of artillery suffered during the summer of 1941 and to use surplus L-11 barrels. The Soviet designation for this gun is not known, but the Germans referred to them as the 7.62 cm FK 250(r).
