= Demon (2015 film) =

2015 Polish supernatural psychological horror dark comedy film

- Theatrical release poster
- Directed by: Marcin Wrona
- Written by: Marcin Wrona; Pawel Maślona
- Produced by: Olga Szymańska; Marcin Wrona
- Starring: Itay Tiran; Agnieszka Żulewska; Tomasz Schuchardt; Andrzej Grabowski; Adam Woronowicz
- Cinematography: Pawel Flis
- Edited by: Piotr Kmiecik
- Music by: Marcin Macuk; Krzysztof Penderecki
- Production companies: Lava Films; Wajda Studio; Silesia Film; Israel Film Fund; Transfax Film Productions; Kraków; Małopolska Kraków Region; Krakow Regional Film Fund; Chimney; Telewizja Polska; Polish Film Institute; Magnet Man Film; The Orchard
- Distributed by: The Orchard
- Release dates: 17 September 2015 (Gdynia FF); 9 September 2016 (Poland)
- Running time: 94 minutes
- Countries: Poland; Israel
- Languages: Polish; English; Yiddish

Demon is a 2015 Polish supernatural psychological horror film produced, written and directed by Marcin Wrona. It was shown in the Vanguard section of the 2015 Toronto International Film Festival. It was Wrona's last feature film, as he died by suicide on 19 September 2015 while promoting the film at the Gdynia Film Festival.

== Plot ==
Polish Briton Piotr (Itay Tiran), who has been living and working in England for many years, and Żaneta (Agnieszka Żulewska), a Polish lady, are to be married; they had met only over the Internet, but he knew her brother. Piotr speaks Polish awkwardly, remembering more from his ancestors than from personal experience. He moves into a run-down large rural estate previously owned by Żaneta's grandfather.

While digging in the yard with a backhoe right before the wedding, Piotr finds a skeleton, which at first he keeps quiet about. He is increasingly haunted by the vision of a woman in a wedding dress – Hana. During the wedding reception this vision draws closer and closer to him, and he has apparent seizures. He is eventually possessed by Hana, the woman in the dress. Żaneta's family is well-to-do, and they want to keep his breakdown quiet from the rest of the wedding guests, so they distract their guests with vodka and loud music while locking Piotr in the basement, first with a doctor, then a priest. Finally, the teacher (Włodzimierz Press), who appears to be the only surviving Jewish resident of the town pre-war, realizes that Piotr is speaking Yiddish, and that he is possessed by the spirit of Hana, a lovely Jewish girl he knew before the war who suddenly disappeared.

== Cast ==
- Itay Tiran as Piotr "Pyton"
- Agnieszka Żulewska as Żaneta
- Tomasz Schuchardt as "Jasny"
- Andrzej Grabowski as Żaneta's father
- Tomasz Ziętek as Ronaldo
- Katarzyna Gniewkowska as Gabryjelska
- Maria Debska as Hana
- Adam Woronowicz as doctor
- Włodzimierz Press as professor
- Cezary Kosiński as priest

== Reception ==
=== Critical response ===
On review aggregator Rotten Tomatoes, Demon holds an approval rating of 92%, based on 66 reviews, and an average rating of 7.4/10. Its consensus reads, "Ambitious and beautifully shot, Demon delivers a gripping – and sadly final – testament to the singular talent possessed by director/co-writer Marcin Wrona." On Metacritic, the film has a weighted average score of 80 out of 100, based on 19 critics, indicating "generally positive reviews".

Chuck Bowen from Slant Magazine gave the film 3.5 out of 4 stars, writing, "Demon offers a tidal wave of unrelieved longing and regret, with a devilish streak of absurdism." Giuseppe Sedia of the Krakow Post noted that the character played by Israeli actor Itay Tiran turns out to be "the most tormented groom ever seen in Polish film". He added that "the distastrous reception is drenched in vodka just like the banquet displayed in Wojciech Smarzowski's The Wedding but purged from any black comedy". Jake Dee from Arrow in the Head rated the film a score of 8/10, writing, "Shot with a steady and sure-handed formalistic lens, played with credible pathos by all involved, belled with a quizzically unnerving score – despite the humor hampering the horror at times – Demon is a bold and balefully bedeviling Polish delight!" Justin Chang of the Los Angeles Times praised the film's cinematography, and called it " A bravura testament to a talent silenced far too soon.". Joshua Rothkopf from Time Out awarded the film 4 out of 5 stars, writing, "Nailing a tricky sense of physical anarchy (as well as some far subtler domestic tensions), Marcin Wrona’s Polish import is an eerie, extraordinarily poised piece of horror."

The film was not without its detractors. Joe Leydon from Variety commended the film's atmosphere and absurdist humor, but slammed the film's third act. Chris Nashawaty of Entertainment Weekly rated the film a grade C, writing, "Heavy on atmosphere and symbolism but light on actual scares, director Marcin Wrona’s generically titled Demon is a so-so meditation on historical amnesia. It's also so weighted down with mysticism and metaphor it forgets to quicken your pulse or whiten your knuckles." The film was also cited as a possible victim of vote brigading on IMDb.
