= AMC – Andrzej M. Chołdzyński =

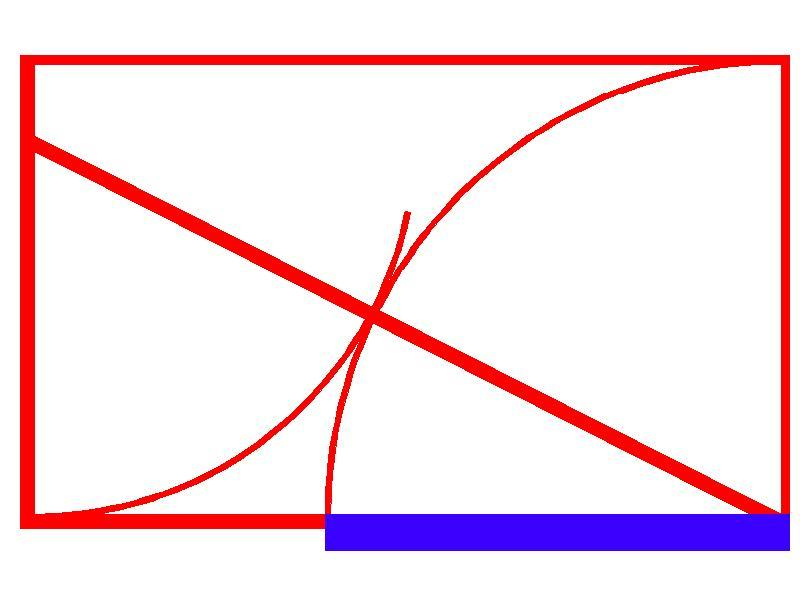

Practice information
- Key architects: Andrzej M. Chołdzyński
- Founded: 1998; 27 years ago

Significant works and honors
- Buildings: "Lipowy Office Park" in Warsaw, Warsaw metro stations: A18 "Plac Wilsona", A22 "Wawrzyszew", A23 "Młociny"

Website
- www.amcholdzynski.pl

AMC – Andrzej M. Chołdzyński formerly AMC and Associates (Polish: AMC i Partnerzy) – is a Polish studio for architecture with headquarters in Warsaw. It was started by Andrzej M. Chołdzyński in 1998.

The core of the design team became architects most of which gained experience throughout-entier design-investment cycle of original designs of Andrzej M. Chołdzyński (co-designer Stanislas Fiszer) of the Stock Exchange Centre buildings in Książęca Street and Plac Wilsona metro station in Warsaw.

The studio has created projects including the complex of office buildings "Lipowy Office Park", Centre for Innovation and Advanced Technologies in Lublin, Warsaw metro stations: A18 "Plac Wilsona", A22 "Wawrzyszew", A23 "Młociny".
