= Chomiczówka =

Neighbourhood of Warsaw, Poland

- Neighbourhood and City Information System area
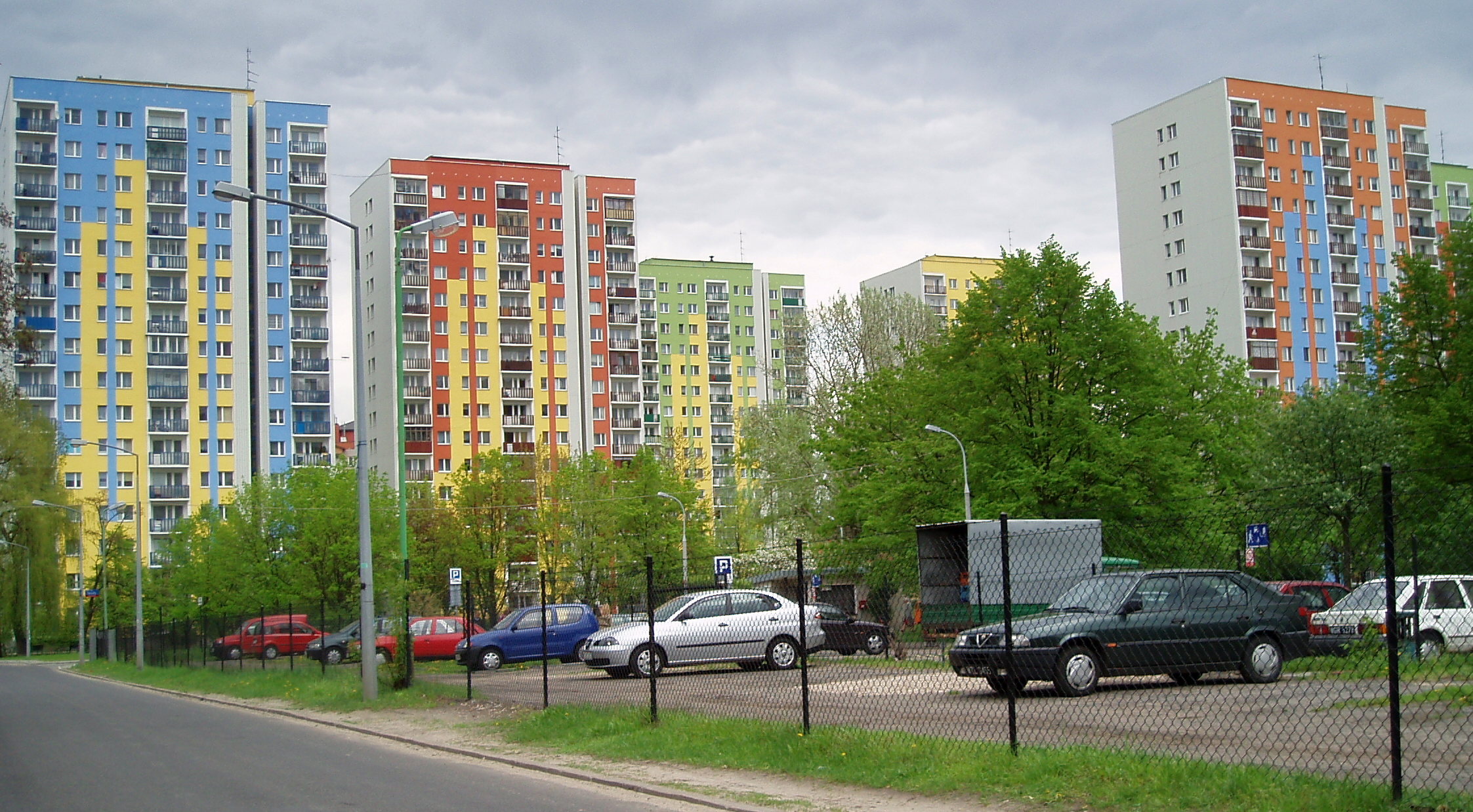
- Apartment buildings in Chomiczówka, in 2006.

- Location of the City Information System area of Chomiczówka within the district of Bielany.
- Coordinates: 52°16′26″N 20°55′39″E
- Country: Poland
- Voivodeship: Masovian
- City and county: Warsaw
- District: Bielany
- Time zone: UTC+1 (CET)
  - Summer (DST): UTC+2 (CEST)
- Area code: +48 22

Chomiczówka (Polish: [xɔ.mit͡ʂˈuf.ka]) is a neighbourhood, and a City Information System area, in Warsaw, Poland, located within the district of Bielany.

== Etymology ==
Chomiczówka is named after Bolesław and Józef Chomicz, brothers and businesspeople, who in 1909 bought a portion of the neighbourhood, and established there a branch of their agricultural company, named Bracia Chomicz (lit. Chomicz Brothers). In 1920, they established here a suburban villa neighbourhood, originally named Chomiczów In 1933, it was renamed to Przylesie, and in the late 1930s, it gradually became known as Chomiczówka while its former name fell out of use.

== History ==
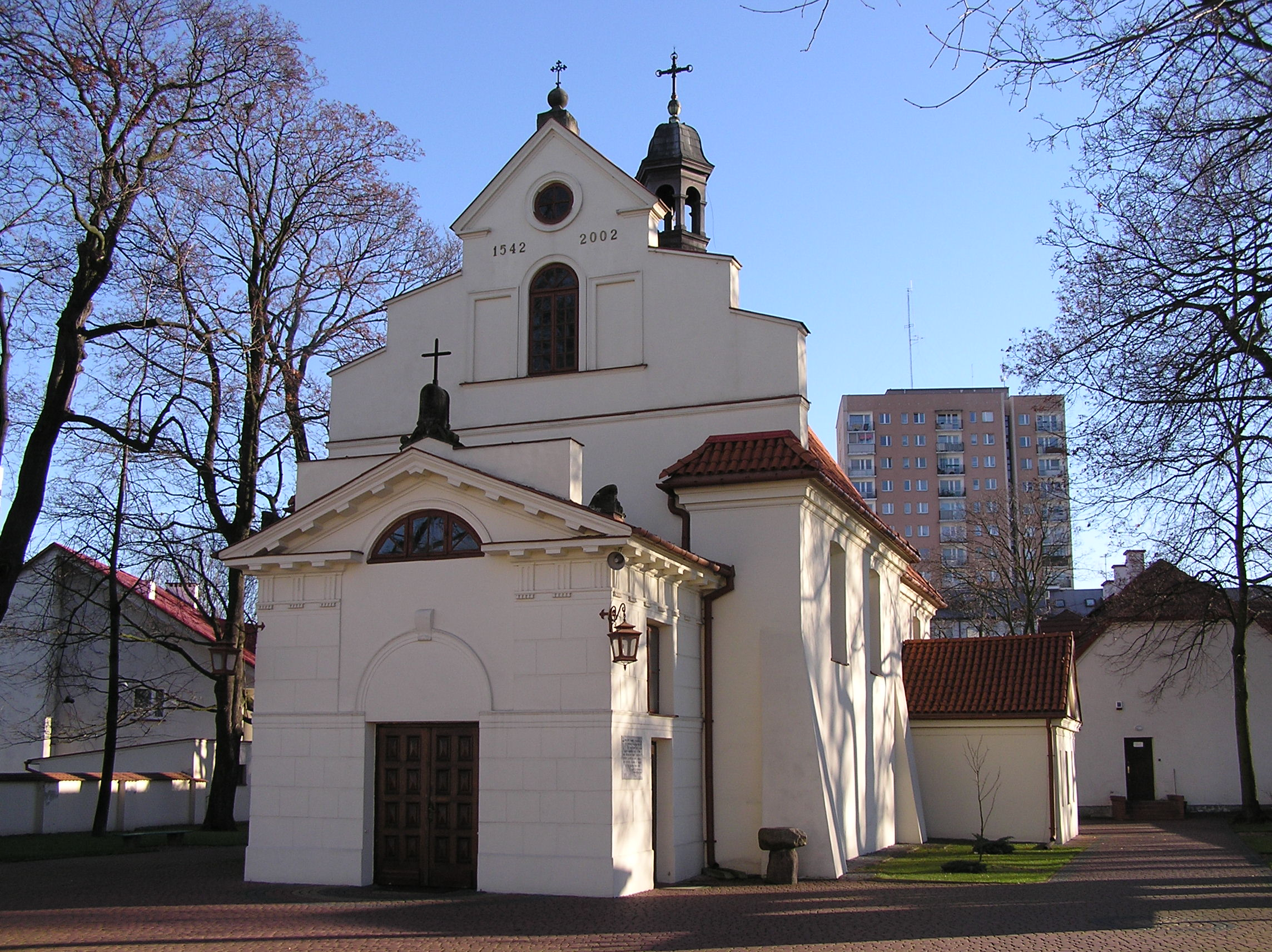
The Church of St. Mary Magdalene, built in Wawrzyszew between 1543 and 1548. Photography taken in 2007.

By 14th century, in the northern portion of modern Chomiczówka existed village of Wawrzyszew. The oldest known records of it comes from 1367. In 1379, Janusz I the Old, the Duke of Warsaw, has granted all profits from five nearby villages, including Wawrzyszew, to the city of Old Warsaw, for the duration of eight years. It was done as one of a few policies, to help it financially offset the costs of building the city walls.

In the 16th century, Baltazar Smosarski, physician of the Polish royal court, has bought the village of Wawrzyszew. There he founded the construction of the Catholic Church of St. Mary Magdalene, which lasted between 1543 and 1548. It is located at the current 64 Wólczyńska Street, within present boundaries of City Information System area of Wawrzyszew.

On 26 August 1794, Wawrzyszew was captured and burned down by Prussian forces during the Siege of Warsaw in the Kościuszko Uprising.

In the 19th century, next to the Church of St. Mary Magdalene was opened the Wawrzyszew Cemetery. The oldest known grave there comes from 1830. Currently it is located within the City Information System area of Wawrzyszew.

In 1868, the area of four settlements, including Wawrzyszew, was given by Alexander II, the Emperor of Russia, to Alexandr Vladimirovich Patkulov, a general in the Russian Imperial Army, as an award for his service.

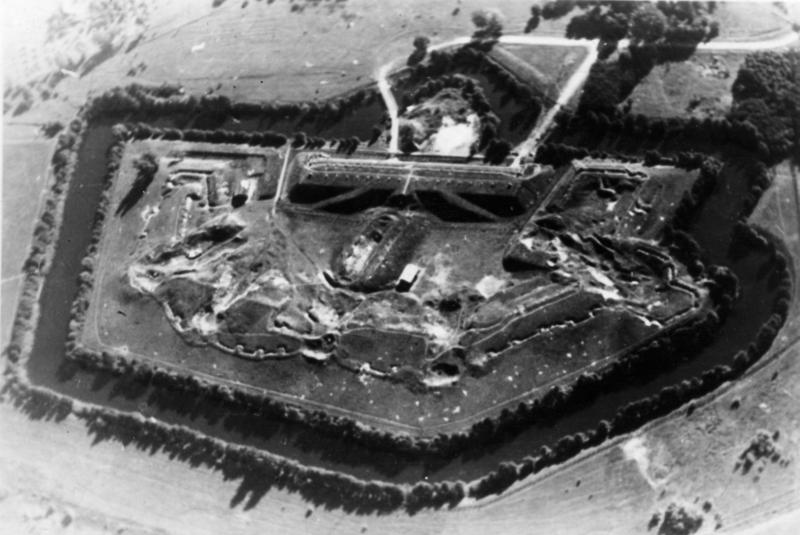
The aerial view of the Fort II in 1939.

In the 1880s, the Fort II had been built to the southeast of Wawrzyszew, as part of the series of fortifications of the Warsaw Fortress, built around Warsaw by the Imperial Russian Army. In 1909, it was decided to decommission and demolish the fortifications of the Warsaw Fortress, due to the high maintenance costs. As such, Fort II was decommissioned and partially demolished.

In 1909, Wawrzyszew was partitioned and sold off. Its southern portion was bought by brothers Bolesław and Józef Chomicz, who then had established the branch of their agricultural company Bracia Chomicz (lit. Chomicz Brothers), with headquarters at 8 Zgody Street. In 1920, they had begun selling plots of land of a suburban residential neighbourhood of villas, named Chomiczów. In 1933, the project was renamed to Przylesie. In the late 1930s, it gradually became known as Chomiczówka while its former name fell out of use. Bracia Chomicz company functioned until 1937.

By 1921, Wawrzyszew was administratively divided into the village of Wawrzyszew Stary (Old Wawrzyszew) to the north, and the settlement of Wawrzyszew Nowy (New Wawrzyszew) to the south. In 1921 Wawrzyszew Stary had a population of 328 people, while Wawrzyszew Nowy, 245 people. By 1933 there were also smaller village of Wawrzyszew Poduchowny, and the settlements of Wawrzyszew Polski, and Wawrzyszew Parafialny.

During the Second World War, on 21 September 1939, the area had been captured by German forces. During the conflict, the Fort II was used as a warehouse. Between 13 and 14 June 1943, a division of the People's Militia of the Worker's Party of Polish Socialists had attacked it, destroying portion of the supplies stored there.

Following the beginning of the Warsaw Uprising, between 1 and 2 August 1944, the Polish partisans of the Home Army had attacked the nearby Bielany Aerodrome, which was heavily guarded by German forces. The attack was unsuccessful, ending in German victory, and retreat of the partisans. There were also clashes in the area of Bielany, including a few small fights in Wawrzyszew. On 3 August 1944, German forces has attacked particants in Bielany, which fought of the attack with heavy loses.

Following the unsuccessful attack, German forces had decided to take revenge on the population of Wawrzyszew. Later that day, German forces, who according to the testimonies of the witnesses were from the Protection Squadron, had entered the village. They had set buildings on fire and destroyed them with grenades, and had expelled the population. People who fought back, or were to slow to leave, were killed at the scene. Additionally, the attackers had d also executed several men. In total 30 people, including women and children, were killed, while portion of the village was burned down. The surviving population was displaced.

On 14 May 1951, the area, including Wawrzyszew Stary, Wawrzyszew Nowy, and Chomiczówka, was incorporated from the municipality of Młociny into the city of Warsaw, within the district of Żoliborz.

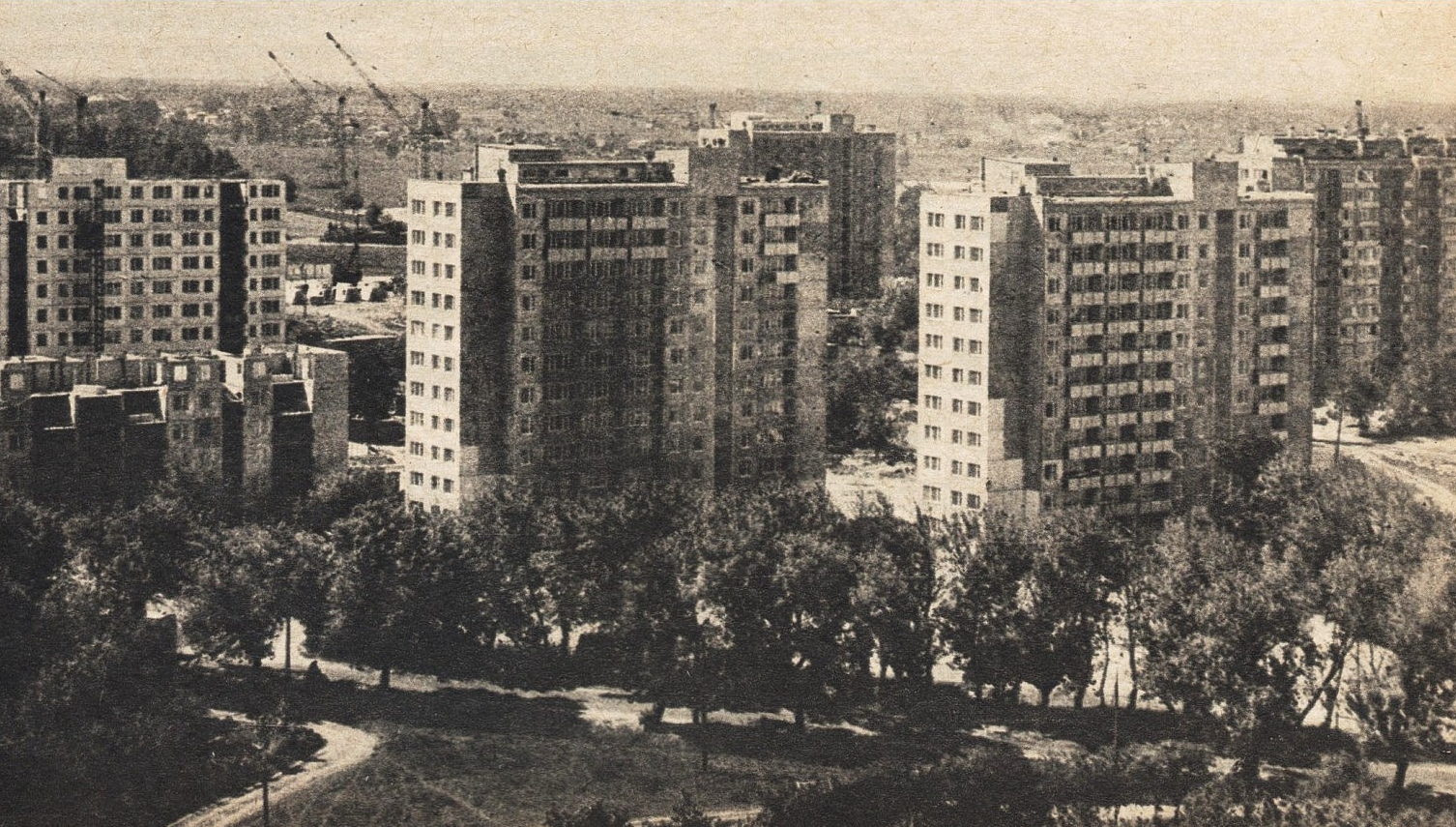
The apartment buildings in Chomiczówka, in 1976.

In the 1970s, there was built a neighbourhood of Chomiczówka, consisting of the multifamily residential large panel system buildings. The Chomicz Park was also built in the centre between residential buildings.

On 19 June 1994, it became part of the city subdivision of the municipality of Warsaw-Bielany. On 27 October 2002, it became part of the district of Bielany.

In 1997, Bielany was subdivided into areas of the City Information System, with Chomiczówka, becoming one of them, consisting of the southern area of historical Wawrzyszew.

Between 1983 and 2003, in Chomiczówka, at 7 Conrada Street, the Catholic Church of the Vergin Mary Help of Christians was built.

== Characteristics ==
Chomiczówka is a residential neighbourhood consisting of the multifamily residential apartment buildings, and low-rise single-family houses. Chomicz Park is located in the central eastern portion of the neighbourhood, placed between residential buildings.

In the eastern portion of the neighbourhood, at 76 Księżycowa Street, is located the decommissioned Fort II, which was built in the 1880s by the Imperial Russian Army, as part of fortifications of the Warsaw Fortress.

At 7 Conrada Street is located the Catholic Church of the Vergin Mary Help of Christians.

== Location and administrative boundaries ==
Wawrzyszew is a neighbourhood, and an area of the City Information System, located in the city of Warsaw, Poland, within the south-central portion of the district of Bielany. To the north its border is determined by Wólczyńska Street, Kwitnąca Streer, and Gotycka Street, Reymonta Avenue; to the south by Księżycowa Street; and to the west, around the area of the Fort II, the buildings at Kalinowej Łąki Street, and Rodziny Połanieckich Street, later near the Esej Street, and in a line connecting to the intersection of Wólczyńska Street and Nocznickiego Street.

It borders Wawrzyszew to the north, Old Bielany, and Piaski to the east, Fort Bema to the southeast, Lotnisko to the south, and Radiowo to the west. Its southern boundary forms the border of Bielany, bordering the district of Bemowo.
