= Wawrzyszew =

Neighbourhood of Warsaw, Poland

- Neighbourhood and City Information System area
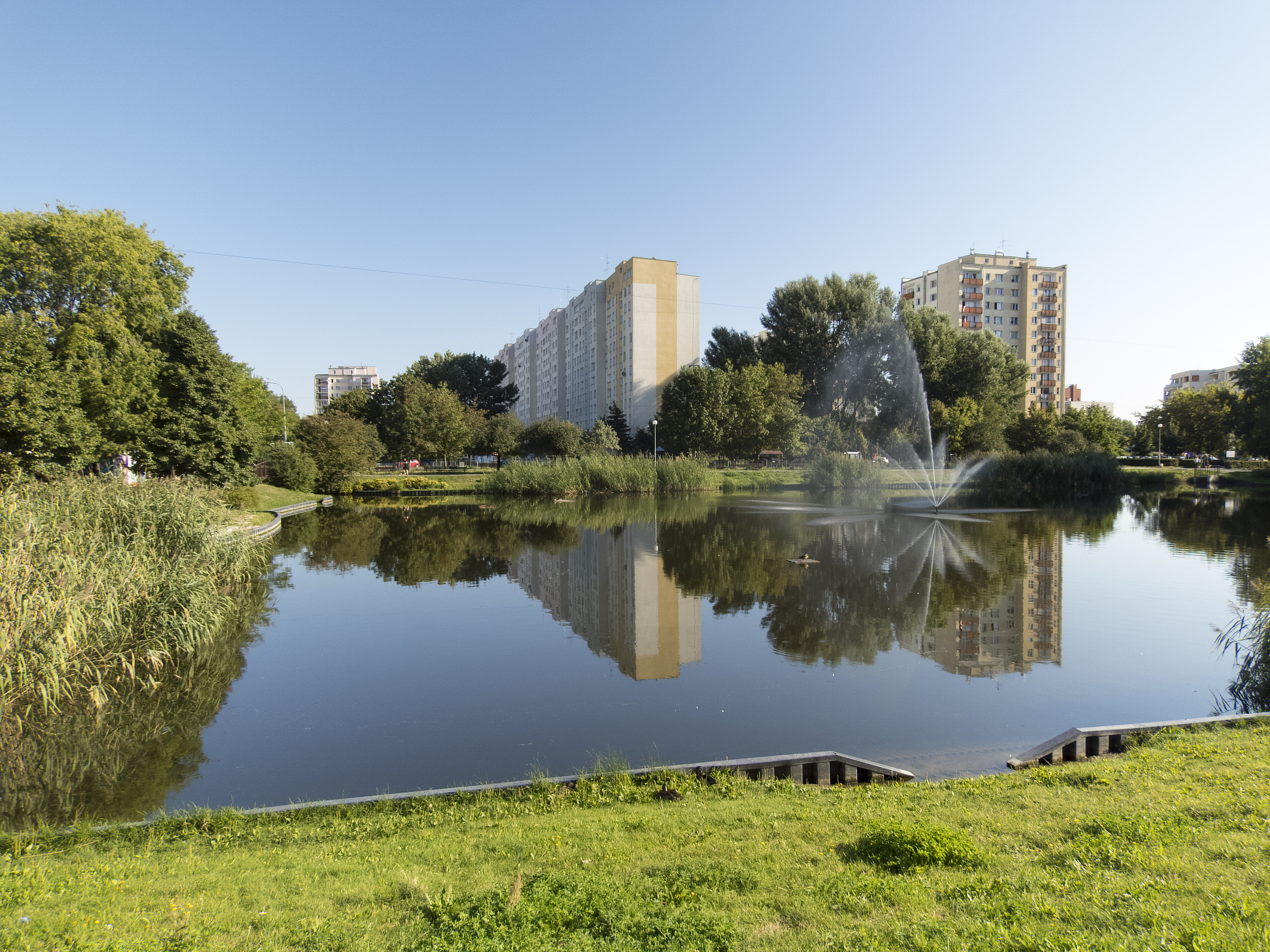
- East Brustman Pond in Wawrzyszew, in 2020.

- Location of the City Information System area of Wawrzyszew within the district of Bielany.
- Coordinates: 52°17′00″N 20°55′55″E
- Country: Poland
- Voivodeship: Masovian
- City and county: Warsaw
- District: Bielany
- Elevation: 95 m (312 ft)
- Time zone: UTC+1 (CET)
  - Summer (DST): UTC+2 (CEST)
- Area code: +48 22

Wawrzyszew (Polish: [vaˈvʐɘ̟.ʂɛf]) is a neighbourhood, and a City Information System area, in Warsaw, Poland, located within the district of Bielany.

== History ==
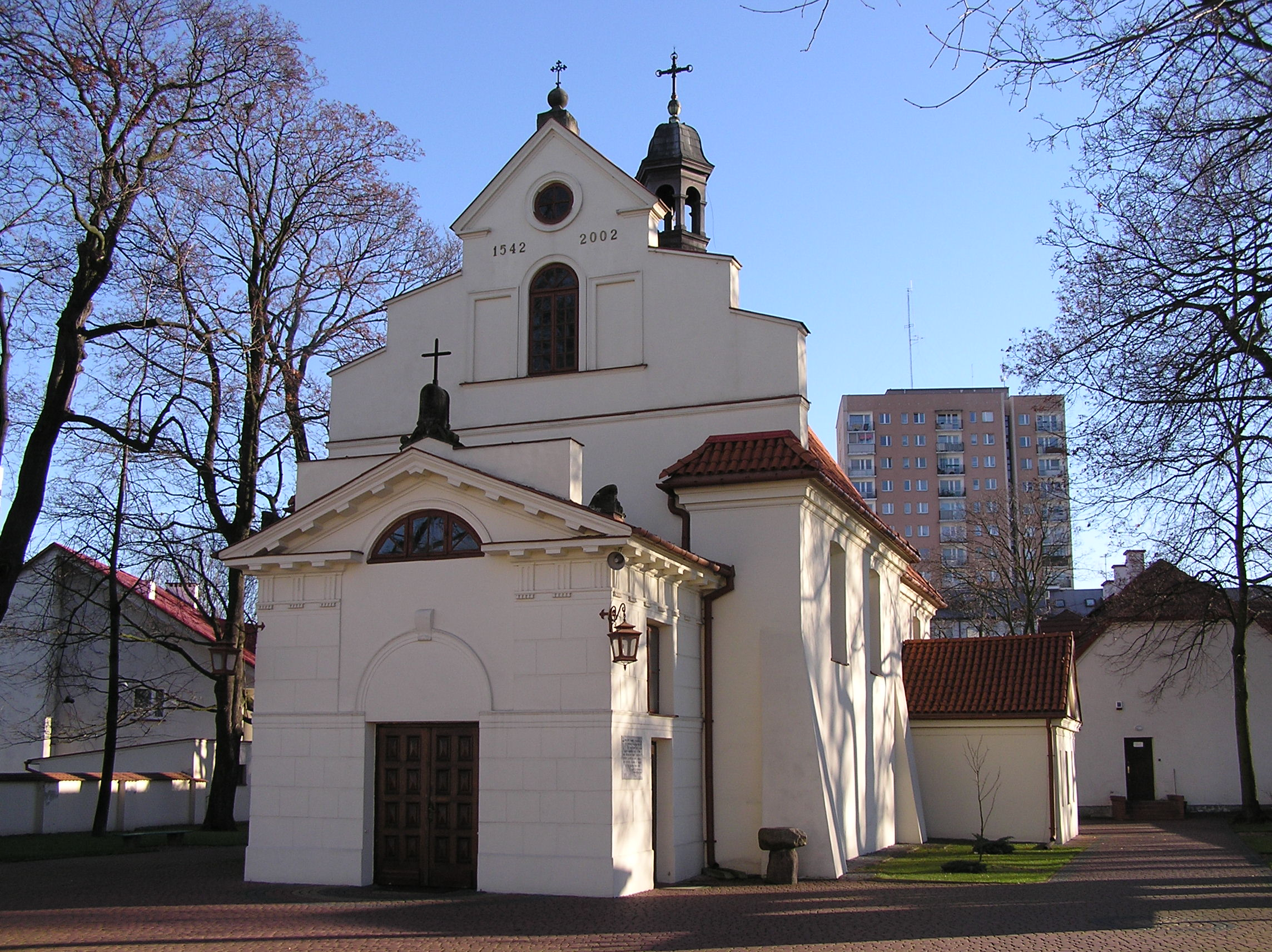
The Church of St. Mary Magdalene, built in Wawrzyszew between 1543 and 1548. Photography taken in 2007.

The first known mention of Wawrzyszew in historical documents comes from 1367. In 1379, Janusz I the Old, the Duke of Warsaw, has granted all profits from five nearby villages, including Wawrzyszew, to the city of Old Warsaw, for eight years. It was done as one of a few policies, to help it financially offset the costs of building the city walls. The village was also historically known as Wawrzyszewo.

In the 16th century, Baltazar Smosarski, a physician of the Polish royal court, bought the village of Wawrzyszew. There he founded the construction of the Catholic Church of St. Mary Magdalene, which lasted between 1543 and 1548. It is located at the current 64 Wólczyńska Street.

On 26 August 1794, Wawrzyszew was captured and burned down by Prussian forces during the Siege of Warsaw in the Kościuszko Uprising.

In the 19th century, next to the Church of St. Mary Magdalene was opened the Wawrzyszew Cemetery. The oldest known grave there comes from 1830.

In 1819, the Institute of Agronomics and Forestry had acquired a portion of Wawrzyszew, where around the 1820s, it built three artificial ponds, connected with canals, which later become known as the Brustman Ponds. Two ponds, and a canal connecting them, survive to the present day, with the third pond being filled up at some point.

In 1868, the area of four settlements, including Wawrzyszew, was given by Alexander II, the Emperor of Russia, to Alexandr Vladimirovich Patkulov, a general in the Russian Imperial Army, as an award for his service. Patkulov has built there his residence, located next to the Brustman Ponds.

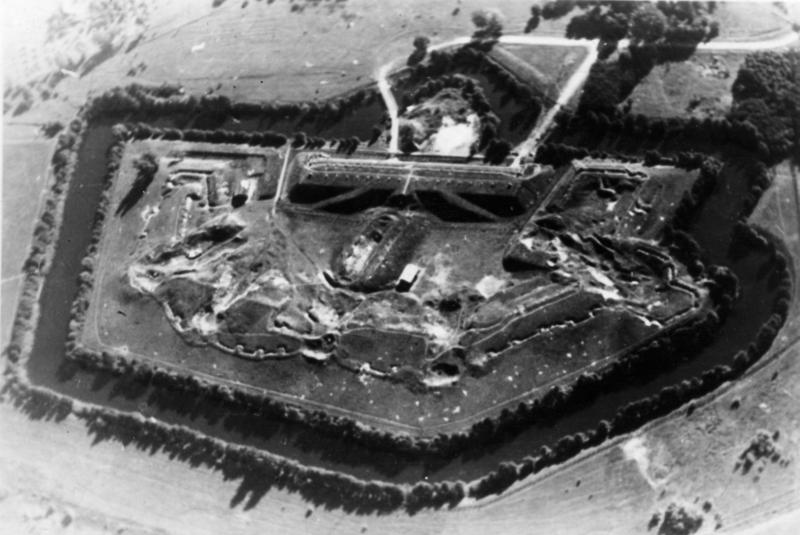
The aerial view of the Fort II in 1939.

In the 1880s, the Fort II had been built to the south-east of Wawrzyszew, as part of the series of fortifications of the Warsaw Fortress, built around Warsaw by the Imperial Russian Army. In 1909, it was decided to decommission and demolish the fortifications of the Warsaw Fortress, due to the high maintenance costs. As such, Fort II was decommissioned and partially demolished. Currently, it is located within the City Information System area of Chomiczówka.

In 1909, Wawrzyszew was partitioned and sold off. Its southern portion was bought by brothers Bolesław and Józef Chomicz, who then had established the branch of their agricultural company Bracia Chomicz (lit. Chomicz Brothers), with headquarters at 8 Zgody Street. In 1920, they had begun selling plots of land in a suburban residential neighbourhood of villas, named Chomiczów. In 1933, the project was renamed to Przylesie. In the late 1930s, it gradually became known as Chomiczówka while its former name fell out of use. Bracia Chomicz company functioned until 1937.

By 1921, Wawrzyszew was administratively divided into the village of Wawrzyszew Stary (Old Wawrzyszew) to the north, and the settlement of Wawrzyszew Nowy (New Wawrzyszew) to the south. In 1921 Wawrzyszew Stary had a population of 328 people, while Wawrzyszew Nowy, 245 people. By 1933 there were also smaller village of Wawrzyszew Poduchowny, and the settlements of Wawrzyszew Polski, and Wawrzyszew Parafialny.

During the Second World War, on 21 September 1939, the area had been captured by German forces. During the conflict, the Fort II was used as a warehouse. Between 13 and 14 June 1943, a division of the People's Militia of the Worker's Party of Polish Socialists had attacked it, destroying a portion of the supplies stored there.

Following the beginning of the Warsaw Uprising, between 1 and 2 August 1944, the Polish partisans of the Home Army had attacked the nearby Bielany Aerodrome, which was heavily guarded by German forces. The attack was unsuccessful, ending in a German victory, and retreat of the partisans. There were also clashes in the area of Bielany, including a few small fights in Wawrzyszew. On 3 August 1944, German forces attacked partisants in Bielany, which fought of the attack with heavy losses.

Following the unsuccessful attack, German forces had decided to take revenge on the population of Wawrzyszew. Later that day, German forces, who according to the testimonies of the witnesses were from the Protection Squadron, had entered the village. They had set buildings on fire, destroyed them with grenades, and expelled the population. People who fought back, or were to slow to leave, were killed at the scene. Additionally, the attackers had d also executed several men. In total 30 people, including women and children, were killed, while a portion of the village was burned down. The surviving population was displaced.

On 14 May 1951, the area, including Wawrzyszew Stary, Wawrzyszew Nowy, and Chomiczówka, was incorporated from the municipality of Młociny into the city of Warsaw, within the district of Żoliborz.

In the 1960s, at 53 Wolumen Street was opened the Wolumen Marketplace.

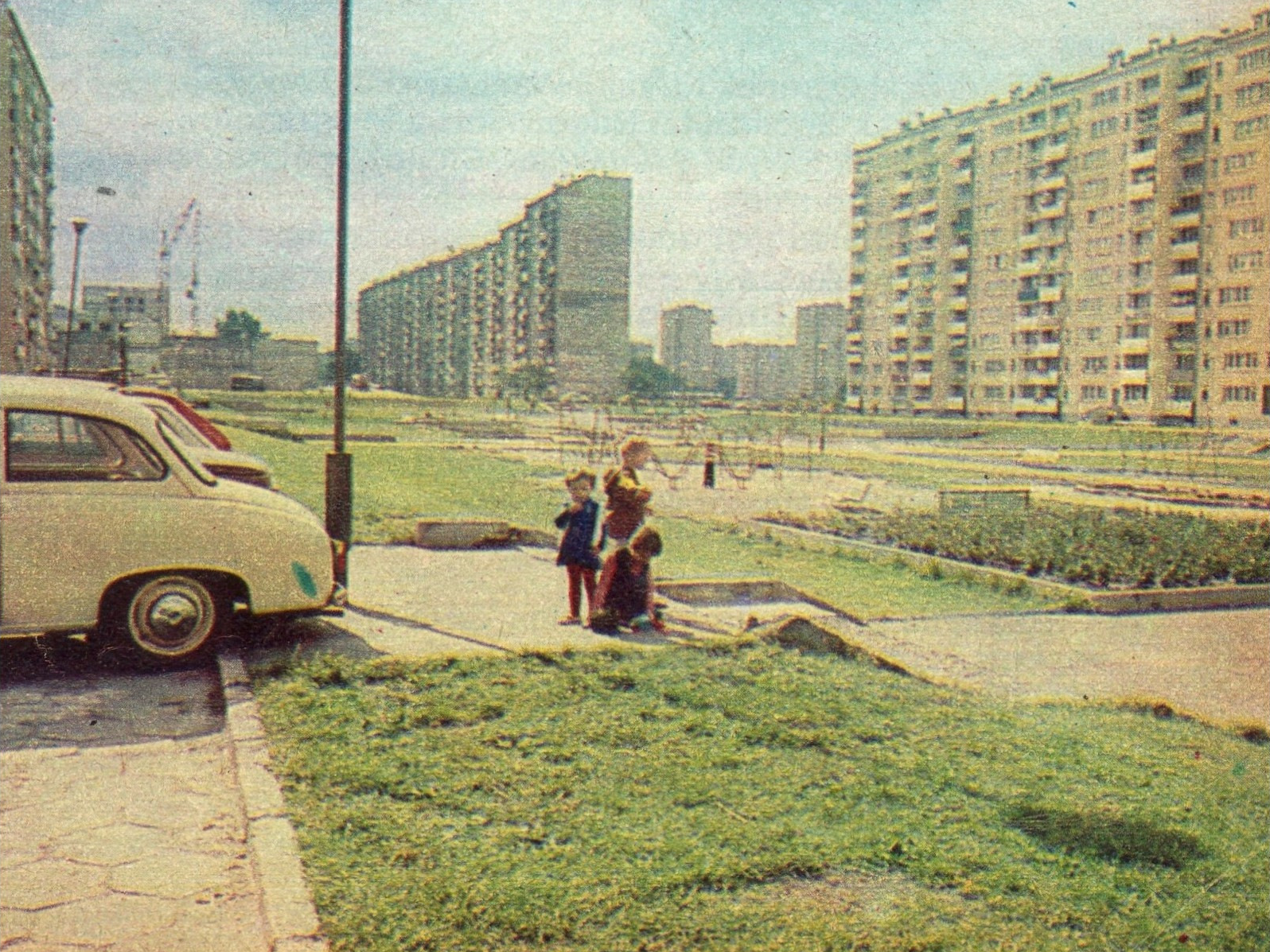
The apartment buildings at 2 and 4 Szekspira Street, in Wawrzyszew, in 1979

In the 1970s, the Warsaw Housing Cooperative built a neighbourhood of Wawrzyszew, consisting of the multifamily residential large panel system buildings. Simultaneously, to the south was built the neighbourhood of Chomiczówka, also consisting of the multifamily residential large panel system buildings.

In 1980, at 1 Goldoniego Street was opened community centre, now known as the Bielany Cultural Centre.

On 19 June 1994, it became part of the city subdivision of the municipality of Warsaw-Bielany. On 27 October 2002, it became part of the district of Bielany.

Between 1994 and 1997, at 64 Wólczyńska Street, next to the Church of St. Mary Magdalene, the new Catholic Church of Mary the Mother of Entrustment was built.

In 1997, Bielany was subdivided into areas of the City Information System. The neighbourhood was divided into two divisions, that being, Wawrzyszew to the north, and Chomiczówka to the south.

On 25 October 2008 in Wawrzyszew were opened two stations of the M1 line of the Warsaw Metro rapid transit underground system. They were Wawrzyszew, located at the intersection of Kasprowicza Street, Lindego Street, and Wolumen Street, and Młociny located at the intersection of Kasprowicza Street, Nocznickiego Street, and Zgrupowania AK "Kampinos" Street.

== Characteristics ==
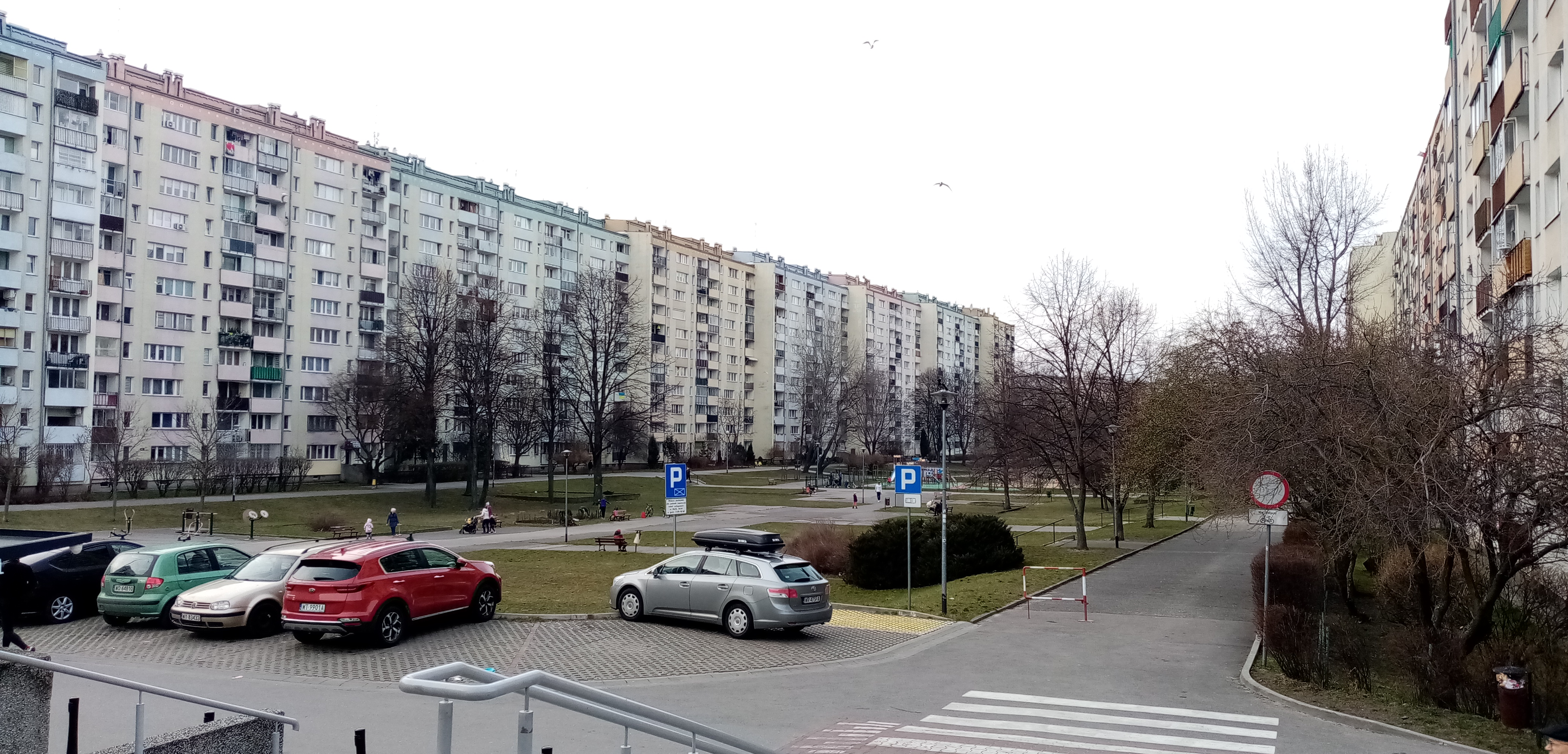
The apartment buildings at 32 Szekspira Street in Wawrzyszew, in 2023.

Wawrzyszew is a residential neighbourhood consisting of the multifamily residential apartment buildings. In the central portion of the neighbourhood is located an urban park centred on the Brustman Ponds, two artificial ponds connected by a canal.

In Wawrzyszew are located two stations of the M1 line of the Warsaw Metro rapid transit underground system. They are Wawrzyszew, located at the intersection of Kasprowicza Street, Lindego Street, and Wolumen Street, and Młociny located at the intersection of Kasprowicza Street, Nocznickiego Street, and Zgrupowania AK "Kampinos" Street.

There are two Catholic churches, the Church of St. Mary Magdalene, and the Church of Mary the Mother of Entrustment. Both are located next to each other, at 64 Wólczyńska Street. Next to them, between Wólczyńska Street, Gotycka Street, and Kwitnąca Street, is located the Wawrzyszew Cemetery.

At 1 Goldoniego Street, is located the Bielany Cultural Center. At 53 Wolumen Street is located the Wolumen Marketplace.

== Location and administrative boundaries ==
Wawrzyszew is a neighbourhood, and an area of the City Information System, located in the city of Warsaw, Poland, within the central southeastern portion of the district of Bielany. To the north its border is determined by Kasprowicza Street; to the east, by Oczapowskiego Street, and Reymonta Street; to the south, by Wólczyńska Street, Kwitnąca Streer, and Gotycka Street; and to the west, by Nocznickiego Street. It borders Wrzeciono to the north, Old Bielany to the east, Chomiczówka to the south, and Radiowo, and Huta to the west.
