= Radiowo =

Neighbourhood of Warsaw, Poland

- Neighbourhood and City Information System area
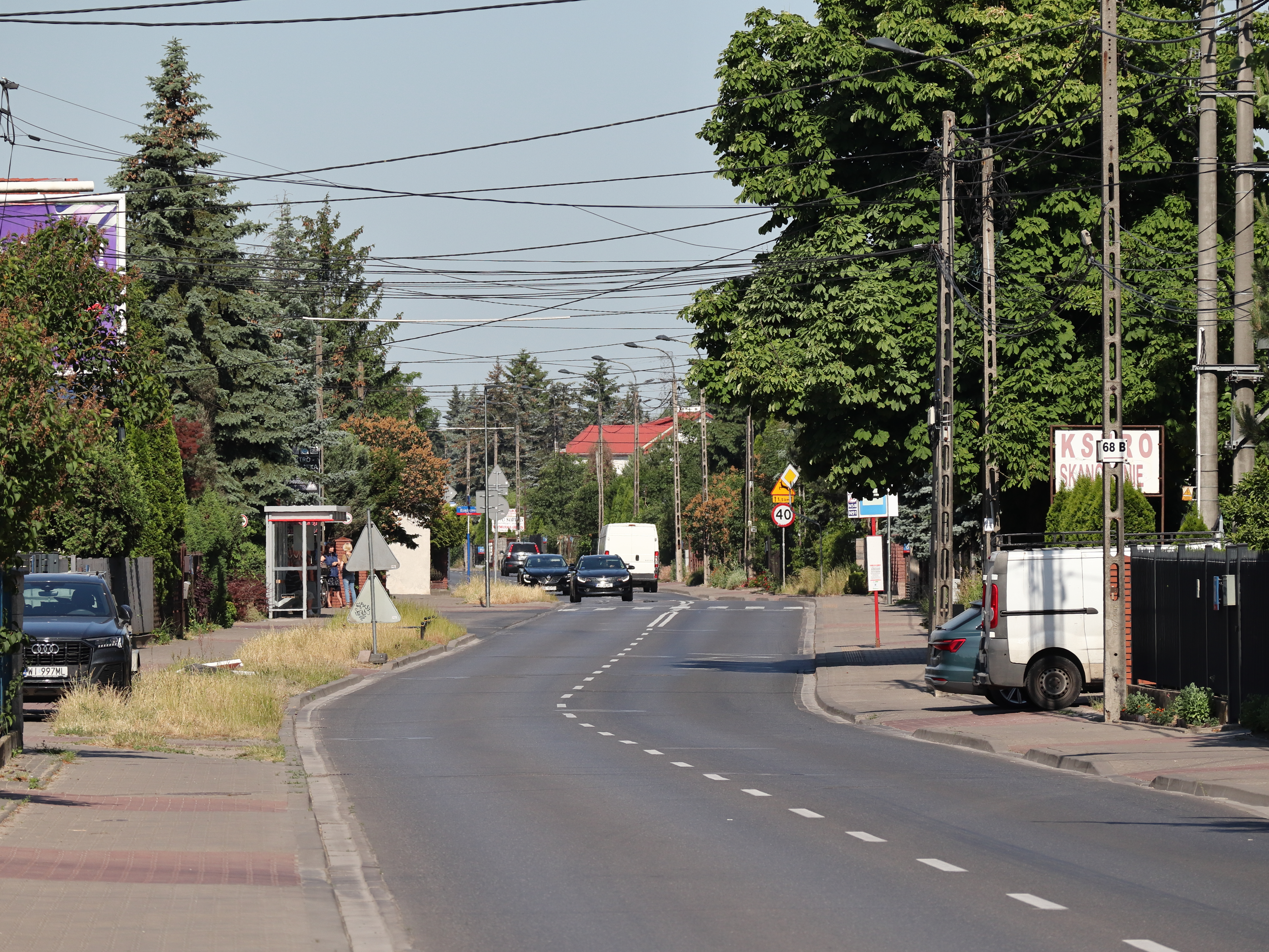
- Arkuszowa Street in Radiowo, in 2023.

- The location of Radiowo within the district of Bielany, in accordance to the divisions of the City Information System.
- Coordinates: 52°17′04.11″N 20°53′52.38″E
- Country: Poland
- Voivodeship: Masovian
- City and county: Warsaw
- District: Bielany
- Time zone: UTC+1 (CET)
  - Summer (DST): UTC+2 (CEST)
- Area code: +48 22

Radiowo (Polish: [raˈdjɔ.vɔ]) is a neighbourhood, and a City Information System area, in Warsaw, Poland, located within the district of Bielany.

In the 17th century, within current boundaries of the neighbourhood was founded the settlement of Opaleń, and later, in the 18th century, there was founded the village of Gać, later renamed to Radiowo. Both were incorporated into the city of Warsaw in 1951.

== Toponomy ==
Radiowo was originally named Gać, with the oldest records of said name being used dating to 1789. In Polish language gać is an archaic term, meaning a material used in isolating house walls. The name of the village was also recorded as Gorczewska Gaca in 1793, and as Gać Górcowska in 1794. The names referred to the nearby village of Górce, which most likely owned Gać at the time.

In the 19th century, Gać became also alternatively known as Floryanów, with both names being used interchangeably. Alternatively, names Florianowo, and Floriany, were also used. The name came from the name Florian, and according to some historians, referred to Florian Znamierowski (1761–1829), a nobleperson who owned Gać and Górce in the 19th century.

In the 20th century, a part of the village became a separate settlement, known as Gać-Floriany (or Gać-Florianowo).

In March 1938, the population of Gać voted in unanimity to change the name of the village to Radiowo, which could be loosely translated from Polish to Radioville. One of main reasons of the name change, was a close resemblance of Gać to word gacie which in Polish means underwear. The name Radiowo was inspired by the nearby Transatlantic Radiotelegraph Exchange.

The Fort IIA, located to the south of the village also became colloquially known as Fort Radiowo. In 1997, the neighbourhood, and the City Information System area in the district of Bemowo, was named Fort Radiowo after it.

== History ==
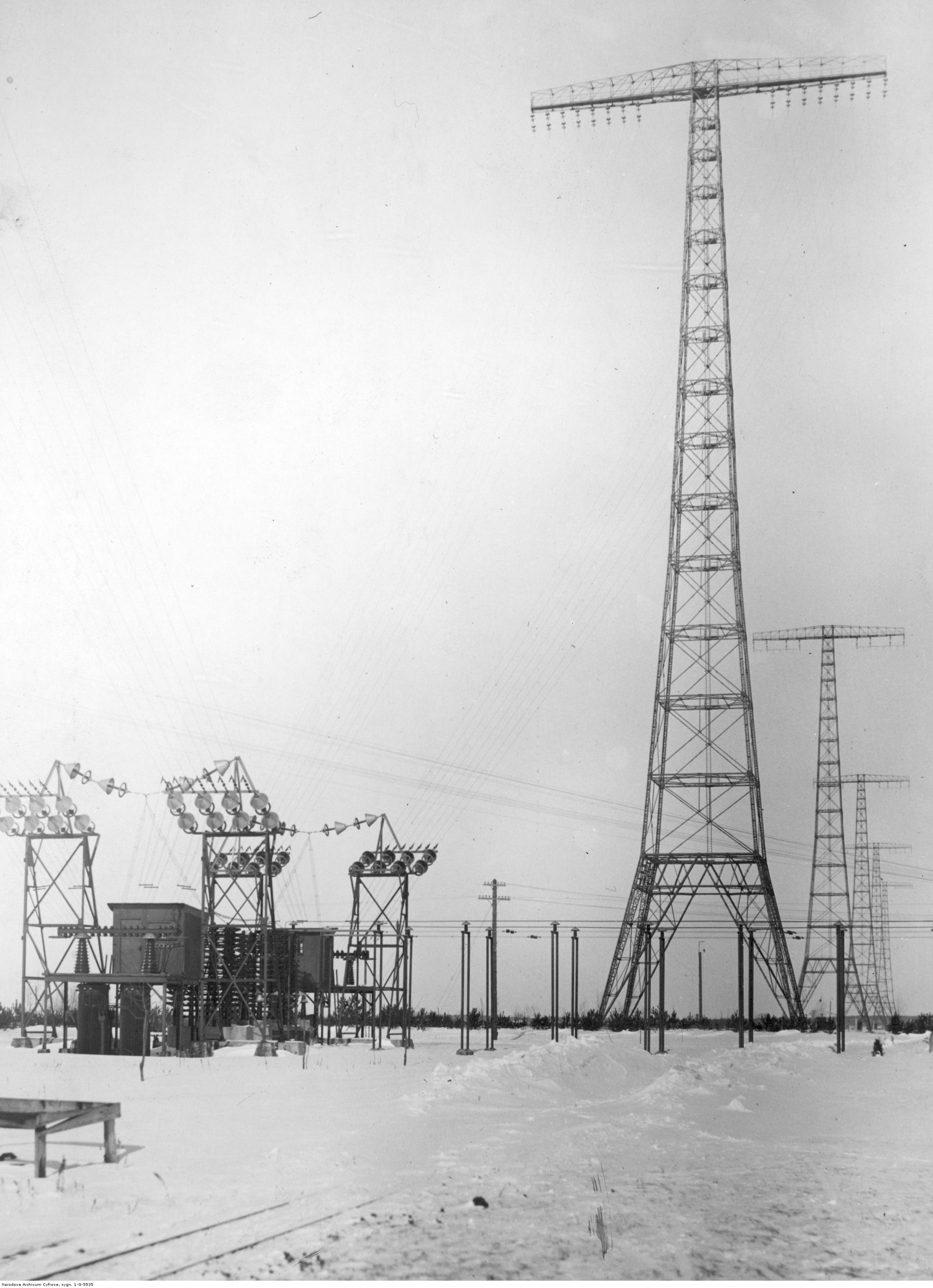
One of the radio masts of the Transatlantic Radiotelegraph Exchange, sometime before 1939.

In the 17th century was founded a settlement of Opaleń (historically also known as Opalin). One of the oldest known records of its name come from 1686. Its exact location has shifted throughout centuries, and by 19th century, it was placed in the southern portion of the current area of Radiowo.

The village of Gać, located within the central portion of the present area of Radiowo, was founded in the 18th century, in the form of a linear settlement centred on Arkuszowa Street. The oldest known written records of its existence date to 1789. The village was most likely a landed estate owned by the nearby village of Górce. It is evident in its names recorded at the time, including Gorczewska Gaca in 1793, and Gać Górcowska in 1794, both referencing Górce. Around 1818, Gać became property of the nearby settlement of Opaleń.

In 1827, Gać had a population of 40 people in 3 households, and in 1921, it had a population of 356 people.

Between 1922 and 1923, several base transceiver station towers of the broadcast station of the Transatlantic Radiotelegraph Exchange were built to the south of Gać. During the Second World War, on 16 January 1945, they were destroyed by retreating German forces.

On 20 October 1933, there was formed the gromada (village assembly) of Gać in the gmina (municipality) of Młociny. It included villages of Gać and Gać-Floriany, and a settlement of Opaleń.

In March 1938, Gać was renamed to Radiowo.

On 15 March 1951, Radiowo and the surrounding area were incorporated into the nearby city of Warsaw.

In 1997, the city district of Bielany was divided into several areas of the City Information System, with Radiowo becoming one of the.

== Location and administrative boundaries ==
Radiowo is a neighbourhood, and an area of the City Information System, located in the city of Warsaw, Poland, within the south-western portion of the district of Bielany. To the north its border is determined by Loteryjki Street, Wólczyńska Street, and Rokokowa Street; the east, by Nocznickiego Street, and it the line to the south to Esej Street, and around the area of the Fort II; to the south, by Kampinoska Street, and Księżycowa Street; and to the west, by Estrady Street.

It borders Huta, Placówka, Wólka Węglowa to the north, Chomiczówka, and Wawrzyszew to the east, Lotnisko to the south, and the municipality of Izabelin. Its southern boundary forms the border of the district of Bielany, bordering Bemowo, and its western boundary forms the border of the city of Warsaw, bordering the Warsaw West County.
