= Janusz Przymanowski =

Polish translator

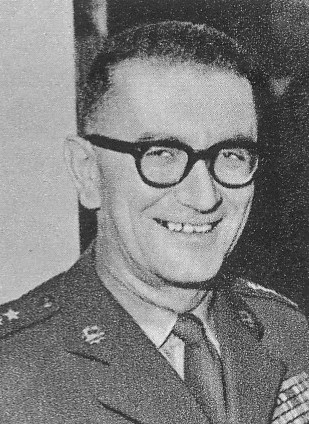
Janusz Przymanowski

Janusz Przymanowski (1922–1998) was a Polish translator and writer. He wrote the novel Four Tank-Men and a Dog on which the TV series Four Tank-Men and a Dog was based.
