= Ballada o pancernych =

Single by Edmund Fetting

from the album Czterej pancerni i pies. Piosenki z serialu telewizyjnego
- Released: 9 May 1966
- Genre: Ballad
- Length: 2:33
- Label: Polskie Nagrania Muza
- Composer: Adam Walaciński
- Lyricist: Agnieszka Osiecka

Audio
- "Ballada o pancernych" on YouTube

"Ballada o pancernych" (Polish: [balˈla.da ˈɔ panˈt͡sɛr.nɘ̟x]; lit. 'The Ballad of the Tank-men'), also known as "Deszcze niespokojne" (Polish: [ˈdɛʃ.t͡ʃɛ ɲɛ.spɔˈkɔj.nɛ]; lit. 'The Restless Rains'), is a Polish-language ballad performed by Edmund Fetting, with its text written by Agnieszka Osiecka, and its music composed by Adam Walaciński. It was created as the theme song for the TVP war adventure television series Four Tank-Men and a Dog, which aired from 1966 to 1970. The song was about titular soldiers traveling with their dog in a tank, as they hoped to survive the Second World War.

== History ==
The song was created as the theme song for the TVP war adventure television series Four Tank-Men and a Dog, which was aired by Telewizja Polska from 1966 to 1970. Wojciech Kilar was originally hired to develop music for the show. However, he soon departed from the production and was replaced by Adam Walaciński, who composed the music for the song. Originally, the television network management was not interested in the melody. They changed their opinion on the music after Walaciński had Agnieszka Osiecka write the lyrics, and Edmund Fetting performed it.

Its second and third verses were used as the theme song in the series, while its first verse was omitted. Two versions of the song were used in the series, with the first used in the first season, and the second, in the remaining seasons. The song was about titular soldiers traveling with their dog in a tank, as they hoped to survive the Second World War. The first episode of the series, titled "Crew", aired on 9 May 1966, while the final episode, titled "Home", aired in 1970.

The song was also translated and covered for Czech and German dubbing versions of Four Tank-Men and a Dog.
