= Małgorzata Niemirska =

Polish stage and film actress (born 1947)

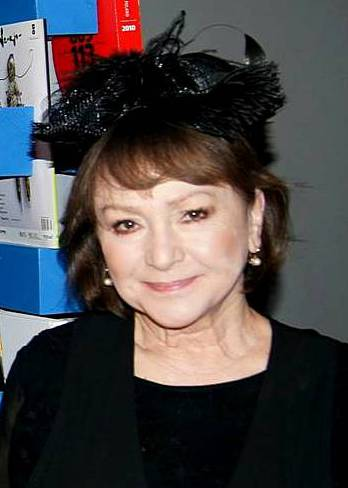
Małgorzata Niemirska, 2013

Małgorzata Niemirska (born 6 June, 1947) is a Polish stage and film actress.

She graduated from the State Drama School in Warsaw in 1969. She also studied at a music school. She performed at the Teatr Dramatyczny im. Gustawa Holoubka and Teatr Studio im. Stanisława Ignacego Witkiewicza. Her major film debut was in the TV series Four Tank-Men and a Dog, where in the role of Lidka she had become a sex symbol.

== Selected filmography ==
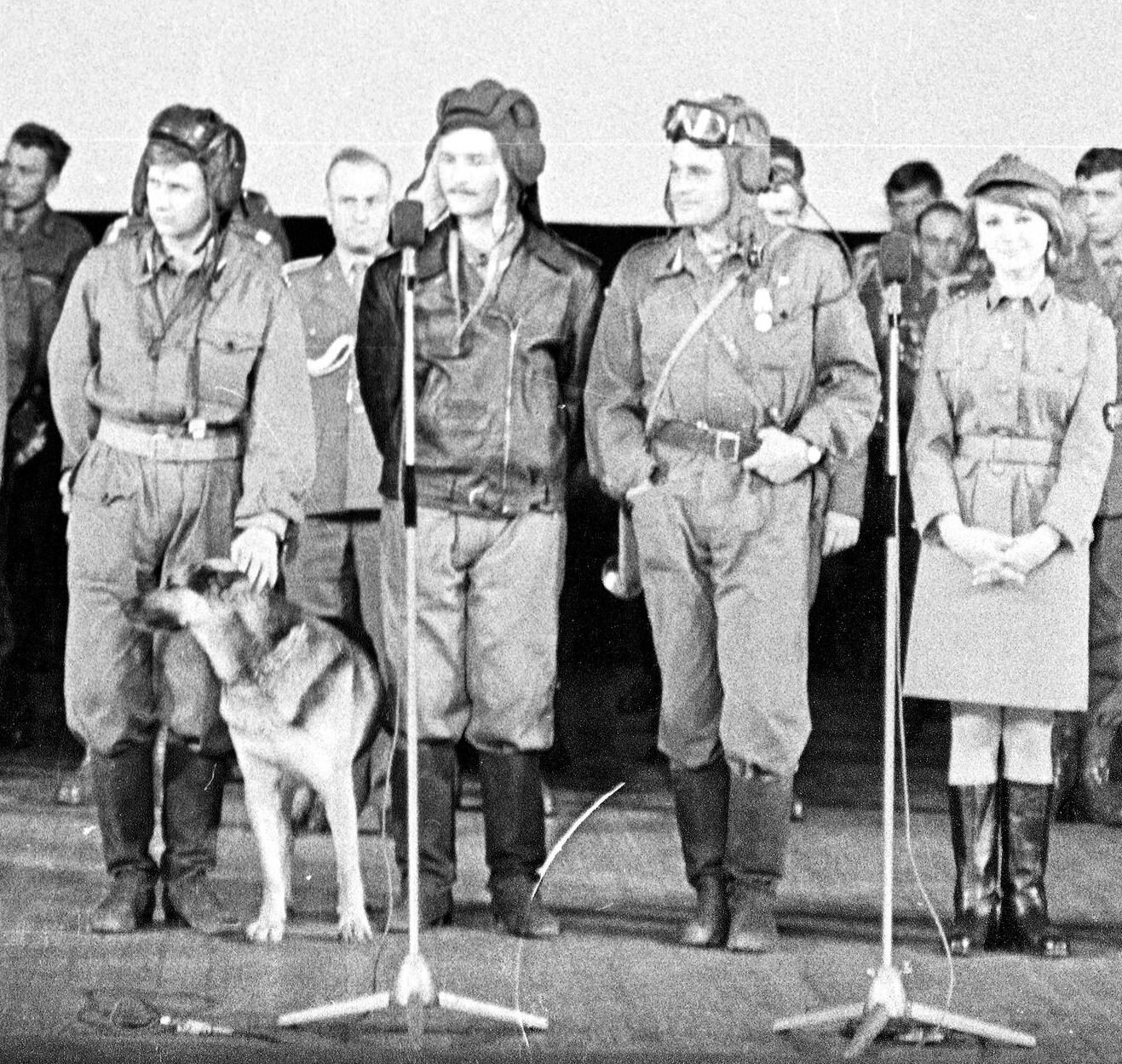
Four Tank-Men and a Dog cast

- 1974: Pingwin, episodic role of a girl in a phone booth
- Four Tank-Men and a Dog, as Lidka
- 2011: Barwy szczęścia soap opera (2007–2026)
- 2015: These Daughters of Mine, as mother

== Awards ==
- 2014:Gloria Artis Medal for Merit to Culture
- 1979: Bronze Cross of Merit
