= Chomicz Park =

Urban park in Warsaw, Poland

- Interactive map of Chomicz Park
- Type: Urban park
- Location: Bielany, Warsaw, Masovian Voivodeship, Poland
- Coordinates: 52°16′26.79″N 20°55′39.84″E
- Created: 1970s

The Chomicz Park (Polish pronunciation: [ˈxɔ.mit͡ʂ]; Polish: Park Chomicza) is an urban park in the city of Warsaw in Masovian Vovivodeship, Poland, within the Bielany district. It is located in the neighbourhood of Chomiczówka, surrounded by apartment buildings, in the area of Conrada and Reymonta Streets. It was developed in the 1970s together with the surrounding housing estate.

== Toponomy ==
The park was named after Bolesław Chomicz (1878–1959), a 20th-century social activist, who worked on organizing and expanding the volunteer fire departments in Poland after the Second World War. Together with his brother, Józef Chomicz, he also co-founded the neighbourhood of villas in the area, named Chomiczówka, which was the namesake of the modern housing estate. The park name was proposed in 2011 by the Association of Volunteer Fire Departments of the Republic of Poland.

== History ==
In the 1970s, a large farmland area was sized by the city, for the development of the high-rise housing estate of Chomiczówka, later in the decade. Numerous apartment buildings, were constructed in the area, using the large panel system technique. An undeveloped land, left between the buildings, were transformed into a park area for the local residents.

In the 1990s, the family of the former owner of a plot of land, now forming part of the park, demanded its return from the city. The plot was located near Aspekt Street, and had an area of 3 ha. The plaintiffs argued that, since the city failed to fulfill the objectives for which the area was acquired, that being the housing development, it was to be returned to the previous owners. The case was given to the jurisdiction of the Warsaw West County to avoid the conflict of interest with the city of Warsaw. In December 2020, the alderman of the county issued an order to return the plot to the heirs. In January 2021, the Bielany district and the Chomiczówka Warsaw Construction and Housing Cooperative (Polish: Warszawska Spółdzielnia Budowlano-Mieszkaniowa „Chomiczówka”) filed the appeal of the decision to the office of the voivode of the Masovian Voivodeship. It was argued that, since it was always planned for a park area to accompany the housing, the city fulfilled its obligations. In July 2022, the voivode sided with Bielany and the housing cooperative, reversing the alderman's decision.
