= Adam Walaciński =

Composer (1928–2015)

- Born: 18 September 1928; Kraków
- Died: 4 August 2015 (aged 86); Kraków
- Education: Państwowa Wyższa Szkoła Muzyczna w Krakowie
- Occupation: Composer

Adam Walaciński (18 September 1928 – 4 August 2015) was a composer, music critic, historian and teacher.

== Biography ==
Adam Walaciński was born in Kraków on 18 September 1928. At the age of 8 he began violin lessons with Stanisław Giebułtowski with whom he continued to study during World War II. In 1945-1946 he was a pupil of violinist Wacław Niemczyk. From 1947 to 1951 he studied violin with Eugenia Umińska at the State Higher School of Music, Kraków (SHSMK). He briefly studied composition with Artur Malawski at the SHSMK in 1952, but dropped out of the school that same year.

While a student at the SHSMK, Walaciński was a violinist in the Orkiestra Polskiego Radia w Warszawie from 1948 to 1956. From 1952 to 1955 Walaciński studied music composition privately with Stefan Kisielewski. He eventually completed his degree years later when he resumed studies at the SHSMK under Bogusław Schaeffer in the 1970s; ultimately earning a diploma in music composition (with distinction) from the SHSMK in 1974. He was appointed a lecturer at the SHSMK (by then renamed the Academy of Music) in 1979 and was made a full professor in 1992.

From the mid 1950s on Walaciński was active as a film score composer, and in 1966 he won a prize from the Polish state for the score to Pharaoh. He concurrently worked as a music journalist and critic for a variety of Polish-language publications; including Dziennik polski, Forum musicum, Ruch muzyczny and Studio. He also served as chairman of the Kraków chapter of the Polish Composers' Union from 1971 to 1987, and was appointed editor of the Encyklopedia muzyczna in 1984; also working as a contributing writer to that publication.

In 1999, a film Portret kompozytora, about life and work of Adam Walaciński, was released. He died on 4 August 2015 and is buried at the Rakowicki Cemetery.

== Filmography ==
- Zimowy zmierzch (1956)
- Spotkania (1957)
- The Real End of the Great War (1957)
- Zamach (1958)
- Pigułki dla Aurelii (1958)
- Małe dramaty (1958)
- Dezerter (1958)
- Baza ludzi umarłych (1958)
- Sygnały (1959)
- Zobaczymy się w niedzielę (1959)
- Mother Joan of the Angels (1960)
- Kolorowe pończochy (1960)
- Historia współczesna (1960)
- Decyzja (1960)
- Odwiedziny prezydenta (1961)
- Nafta (1961)
- Dotknięcie nocy (1961)
- Dwaj panowie N (1961)
- Czas przeszły (1961)
- The Two Who Stole the Moon (1962)
- Nad rzeką (1962)
- Ostatni kurs (1963)
- Skąpani w ogniu (1963)
- Zacne grzechy (1963)
- Pamiętnik pani Hanki (1963)
- Mój drugi ożenek (1963)
- Barwy walki (1964)
- Banda (1964)
- Pharaoh (1965)
- Lenin w Polsce (1965)
- Bigos (1965)
- Na melinę (1965)
- Niewiarygodne przygody Marka Piegusa (1966; TV series)
- Kochajmy syrenki (1966)
- Gdzie jest trzeci król (1966)
- Four Tank-Men and a Dog (1966–1970; TV series); including main theme Ballada o pancernych
- Zwariowana noc (1967)
- Zabijaka (1967)
- Twarzą w twarz (1967)
- Poradnik matrymonialny (1967)
- Poczmistrz (1967)
- Piękny był pogrzeb, ludzie płakali (1967)
- Fatalista (1967)
- Kierunek Berlin (1968)
- Ostatnie dni (1969)
- Szansa (1970)
- Prawdzie w oczy (1970)
- Kaszebe (1970)
- Aktorka (1971)
- Diament radży (1971)
- Na skalnym Podhalu (1973)
- Zwycięstwo (1974)
- Dom moich synów (1975)
- Zielone – minione... (1976)
- Wszyscy i nikt (1977)
- Death of a President (1977)
- Placówka (1979)

Source.

== Books ==
- Retrospekcje. Teksty o muzyce XX wieku.

== Awards ==
- Knight's Cross of the Order of Polonia Restituta (1985)
- Gold Gloria Artis Medal for Merit to Culture (2010)
