= Marcin Wrona =

Polish film director

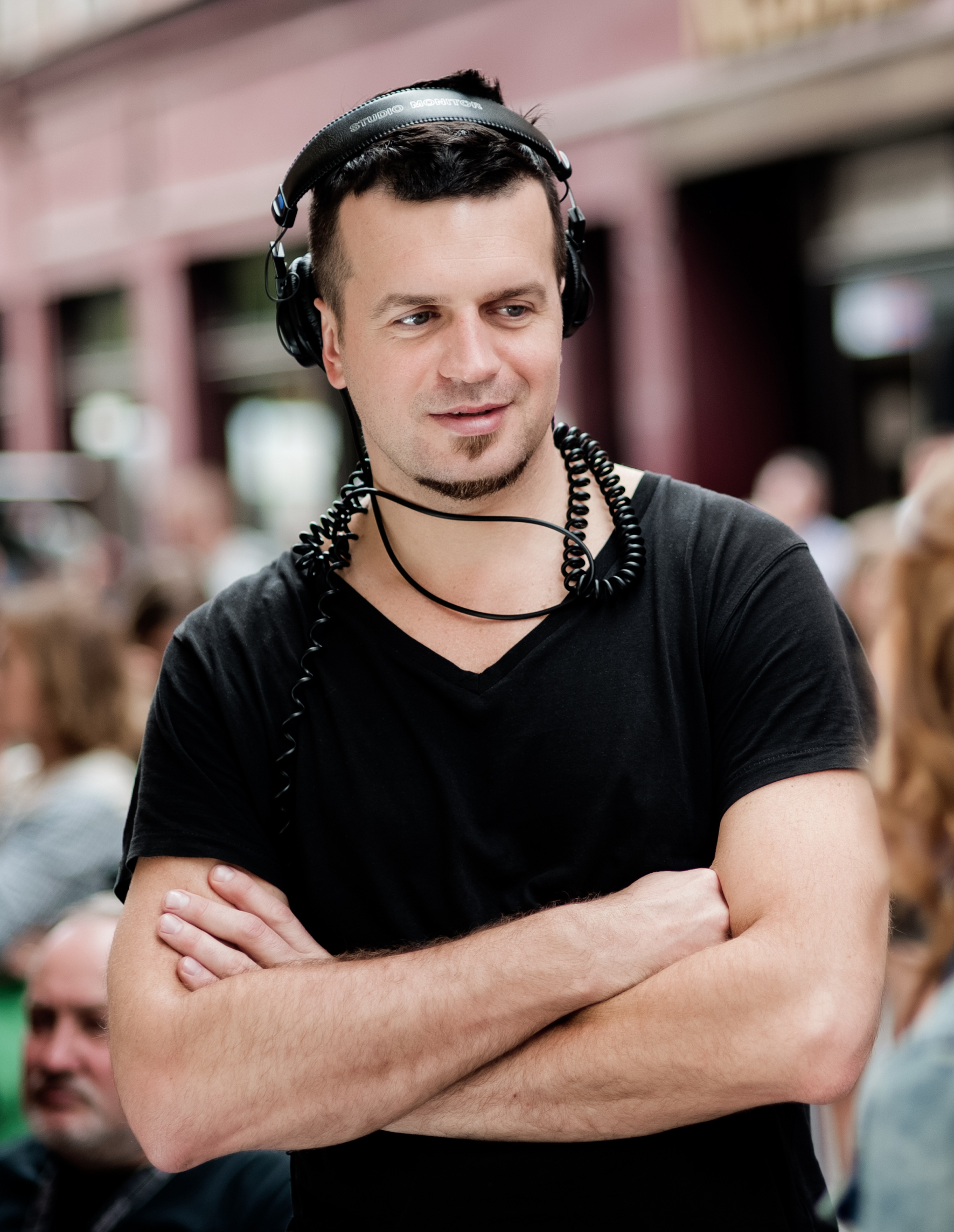
- Wrona in August 2012.
- Born: 25 March 1973; Tarnów, Poland
- Died: 19 September 2015 (aged 42); Gdynia, Poland
- Occupations: Director, screenwriter
- Years active: 2001–2015
- Spouse: Olga Szymanska (m. ?–2015; his death)

Marcin Wrona (25 March 1973 – 19 September 2015) was a Polish film director. His film Demon was shown at the 2015 Toronto International Film Festival. He debuted at the TIFF in 2010, with The Christening, and was also director of the Polish television series Medics.

Wrona committed suicide by hanging in a hotel room on 19 September 2015 in Gdynia, while a film festival was taking place there. The film Demon had been previously shown in Toronto and was shown in Gdynia.
