= Four Tank-Men and a Dog =

1960s Polish television series

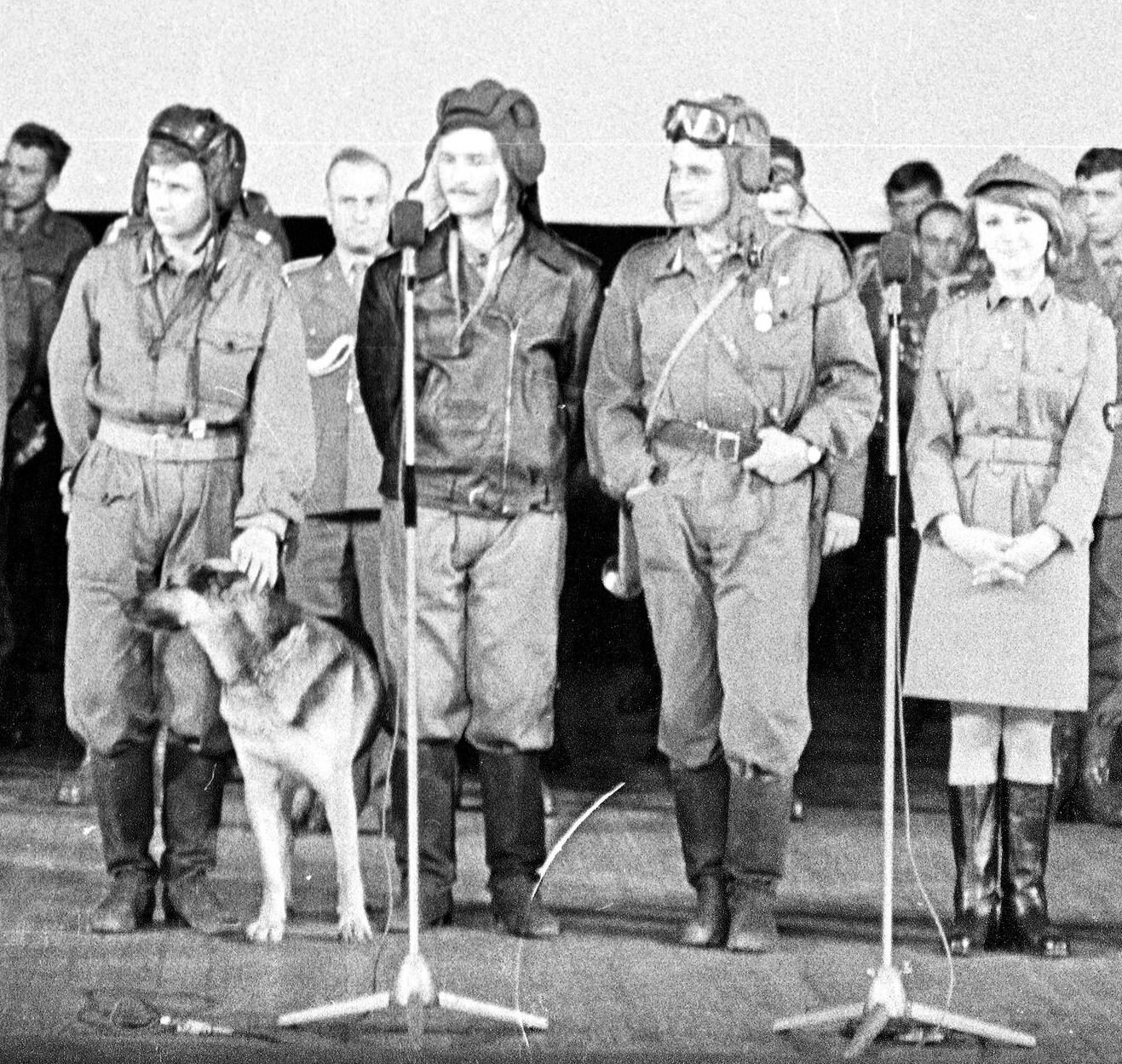
- The main cast of the Four Tank-Men and a Dog at the series premiere in Warsaw's Congress Hall, 3 January 1966.
- Created by: Konrad Nałęcki; Andrzej Czekalski (episode 20)
- Screenplay by: Janusz Przymanowski; Stanisław Wohl
- Starring: Janusz Gajos; Franciszek Pieczka; Włodzimierz Press; Pola Raksa; Wiesław Gołas; Roman Wilhelmi; Małgorzata Niemirska; Aleksandr Belyavsky; Tadeusz Fijewski
- Music by: Adam Walaciński
- Opening theme: "Ballada o pancernych" by Edmund Fetting
- Country of origin: Poland
- Original languages: Polish; German; Russian
- No. of episodes: 21

Production
- Running time: 55 minutes

Original release
- Network: TVP
- Release: 25 September 1966 – 1970

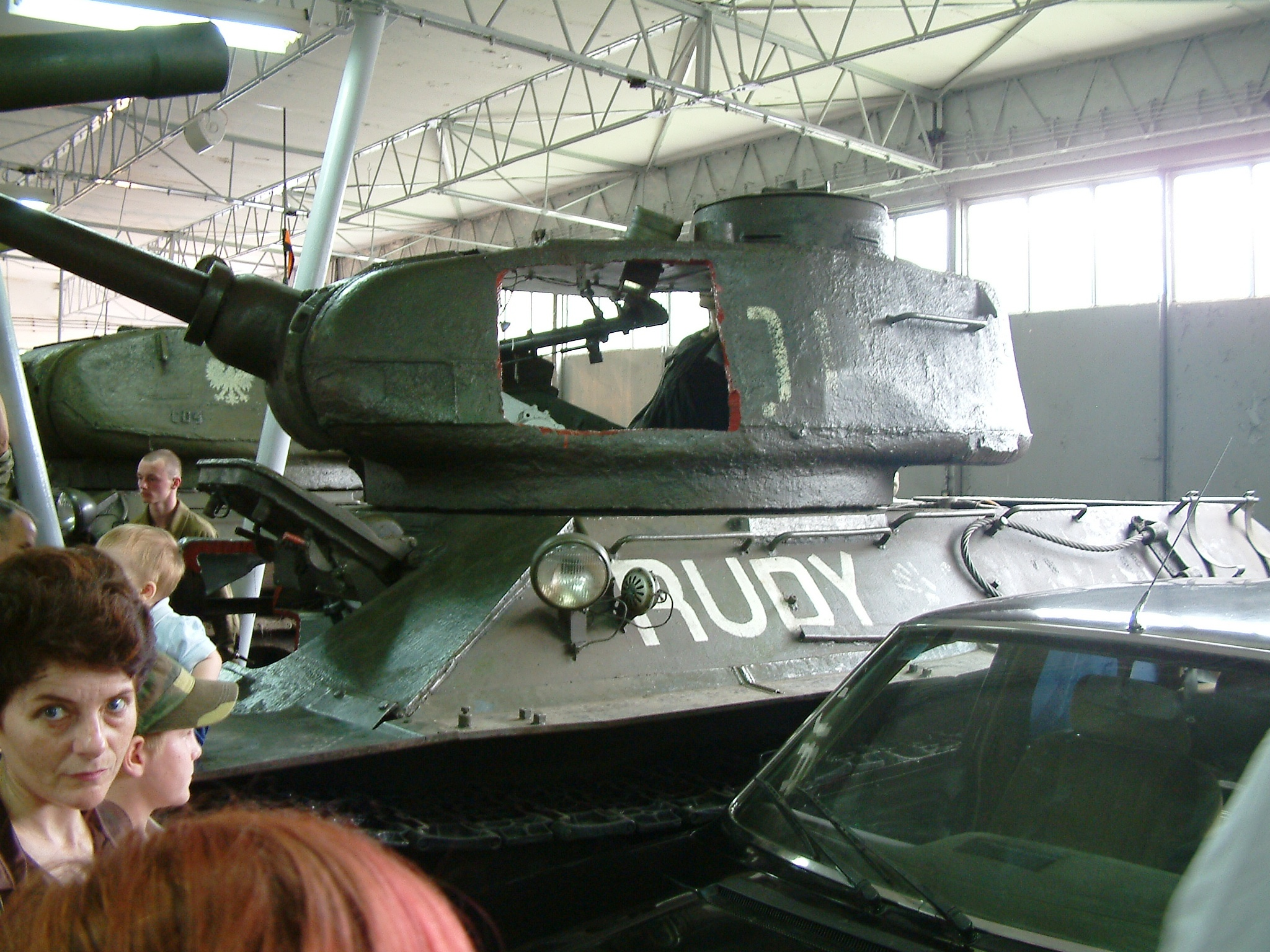
T-34-85 used during the making of the series for tank interior scenes. Museum of Armoured Warfare in Poznań

Four Tank-Men and a Dog (Polish: Czterej pancerni i pies, Polish pronunciation: [ˈt͡ʂtɛrɛj panˈt͡sɛrɲi i ˈpʲɛs]) was a Polish black and white TV series based on the book by Janusz Przymanowski. Made between 1966 and 1970, the series comprises 21 episodes of 55 minutes each, broadcast over three seasons. The story takes place in 1944 and 1945, during World War II, and follows the adventures of a tank crew and their T-34 tank on the Eastern Front in the 1st Polish Army. The book and TV series have achieved and retain a cult series status in Poland, in the former Soviet Union and in other Eastern Bloc countries.

The T-34-85 tank Rudy (Ginger) with the identifying number "102", a German Shepherd dog from Siberia named Szarik (pronounced "Shareek" – little ball in Russian, a nickname in the vein of "furball"; in Polish, the word is similar to szary meaning "gray" and to szalik meaning "scarf") and to a lesser extent the crew (Jan Kos, Gustaw Jeleń, Grigorij Saakaszwili, Tomasz Czereśniak, and their commander and mentor Olgierd Jarosz), as well as other heroes of the series, have become icons in Polish popular culture.

== History ==
The first episode of the series was aired on TVP on 25 September 1966. It was in TVP from 1966, 1969, and 1970, though it had multiple reruns on other channels.

The first series was based on Janusz Przymanowski's book Four Tank-Men and a Dog. After the first airing of the show, it rose in popularity quickly, leading to Przymanowski writing two other volumes of the book.

The next two volumes of the book were adapted into the second season (1969) and the third (1970).

== Characters ==
=== The crew ===
- Olgierd Jarosz, "Olgierd", a tank commander, played by Roman Wilhelmi.
- Gustaw Jeleń, "Gustlik", a loader, played by Franciszek Pieczka.
- Jan Kos, "Janek", a machine gunner/radio operator, later the second commander, played by Janusz Gajos.
- Grigorij Saakaszwili, "Grześ", a driver. Native Georgian, played by Włodzimierz Press.
- Tomasz Czereśniak, "Tomuś" / Tomek", a second gunner, played by Wiesław Gołas.
- Szarik, "Kuleczka", the dog mentioned in the title of the series.
- Franek Wichura, a truck driver, played by Witold Pyrkosz. His surname means "gale", which is a relation to his energetic character.

=== Secondary characters ===
- Marusia "Ogoniok", a Russian nurse and Janek's love interest, played by Pola Raksa.
- Lidia Wiśniewska, "Lidka", a radio operator, played by Małgorzata Niemirska.
- Honorata, a former maid, played by Barbara Krafftówna.
- The colonel, Stary, played by Tadeusz Kalinowski.
- Corporal Daniel Łażewski, played by Tomasz Zaliwski.
- Obergefreiter Kugel, played by Stanisław Gronkowski.

At least two real tanks were used as "Rudy" in this series. One of them, used for tank interior scenes with cameras placed inside the hull, is now displayed in the Armoured Warfare Museum inside the Land Forces Training Center in Poznań. Although referred to as being armed with a 76 mm gun, the tanks seen in the show are the later model T-34/85.

== List of episodes ==
Season I, 1966

1. Załoga (Crew)
2. Radość i gorycz (Happiness and Bitterness)
3. Gdzie my – tam granica (Where We Are, There's the Border)
4. Psi pazur (Dog's claw)
5. Rudy, miód i krzyże ("Ginger", Honey and Crosses)
6. Most (Bridge)
7. Rozstajne drogi (Crossroads [We Are Separating])
8. Brzeg morza (Seashore)

Season II, 1969

1. Zamiana (the Swap)
2. Kwadrans po nieparzystej (A Quarter Past an Odd Hour)
3. Wojenny siew (Wartime Sowing)
4. Fort Olgierd (Fort Olgierd)
5. Zakład o śmierć (Death Bet)
6. Czerwona seria (Red Burst)
7. Wysoka fala (High Wave)
8. Daleki patrol (Long Patrol)

Season III, 1970

1. Klin (Wedge)
2. Pierścienie (Rings)
3. Tiergarten (Tiergarten)
4. Brama (Gate)
5. Dom (Home)

== Popularity ==
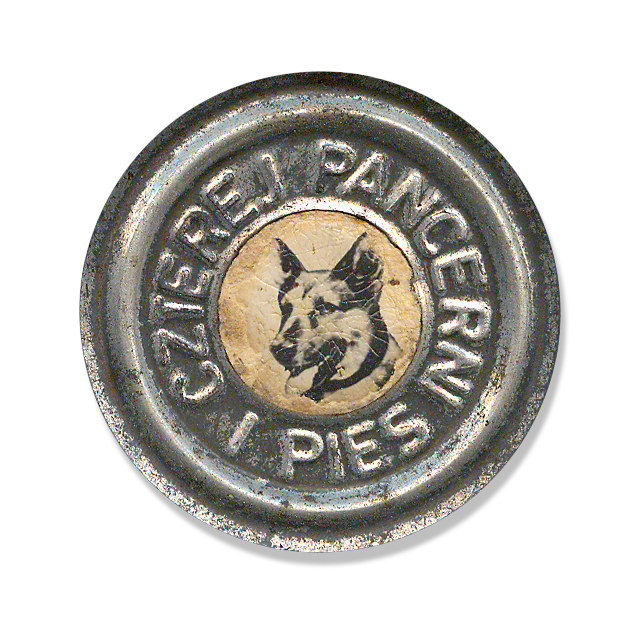
A memorabilia pin of the TV show.

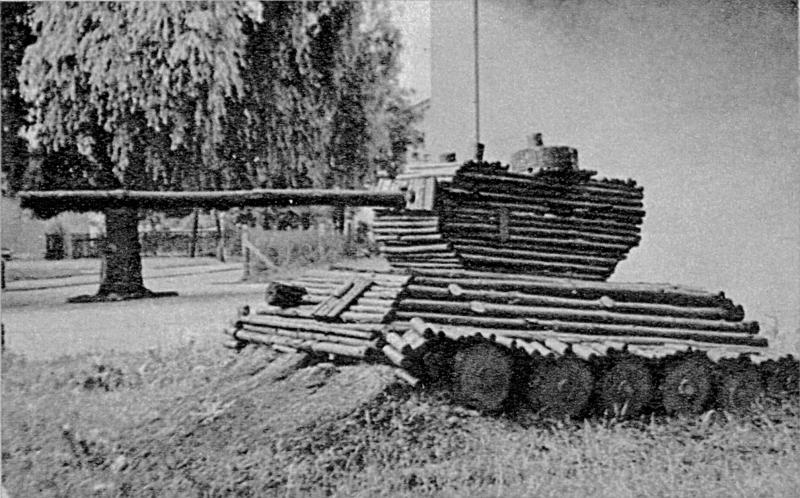
A wooden tank made by unknown enthusiasts of the series from Rawicz

The popularity of the series came from it being one of the first postwar series to depict the era of World War II in a somewhat lighter vein. As the tragic events of the war receded, the Polish public became tired of the mandatory dark, tragic tone of previous television series and films dealing with wartime events. A similar change in attitudes occurred elsewhere in the world at the time. At the same time, the series was definitely not a comedy and contained many sad moments and intense battle scenes, while some of the main characters were wounded or killed. The series (especially in the first season) was very well prepared in terms of its technical side due to significant cooperation with the Polish People's Army and good military training of the actors (most of them being already trained as a two-year military duty was compulsory at the time).

The principal members of the tanks crew possess distinct skills and characteristics. Janek Kos, the youngest member is a skilled marksman, and is accompanied by his trained dog, Szarik. Gustlik, a native to Silesia, who serves as the tank leader, is noted for his physical strength. Grigorij, a Georgian serving in the Soviet Red Army, is the crew's driver and represents Soviet soldiers assigned to Polish tank units to fill special roles. The first commander Olgierd Jarosz was a meteorologist and could forecast the weather (in the book he was Russian Wasyl (Vasiliy) Semenov). Tomek, the last member of the crew (appearing later), was joyful and played the accordion.

The upbeat view of the war shown in the series was popular, but in many ways problematic. From the standpoint of military realism, the series is in fact almost grotesque, as its heroes have a very relaxed concept of military discipline, frequently fight their own "private" battles in defiance of orders, and effortlessly defeat German soldiers, who are depicted as faceless military incompetents. An emphasis is put on the friendship between front-line Polish and Soviet soldiers, but little or no mention of the problems in general Polish-Soviet relations of that era.

The series retained its huge popularity and was rerun yearly in Poland until 1989. After 1989 the series is still being sporadically shown in Poland. It was also shown in other countries of the Soviet bloc.

In 2006 the series was released on DVD as a boxed set by TVP.

In 2015, gaming company Wargaming introduced 4 premium vehicles to the game World of Tanks in an event marking VE day, one of the limited vehicles being Rudy, with a crew based on characters from the series including, Szarik.

== See also ==
- Captain Kloss
