= Suppression of Wawrzyszew =

Coordinates: 52°17′00″N 20°55′55″E

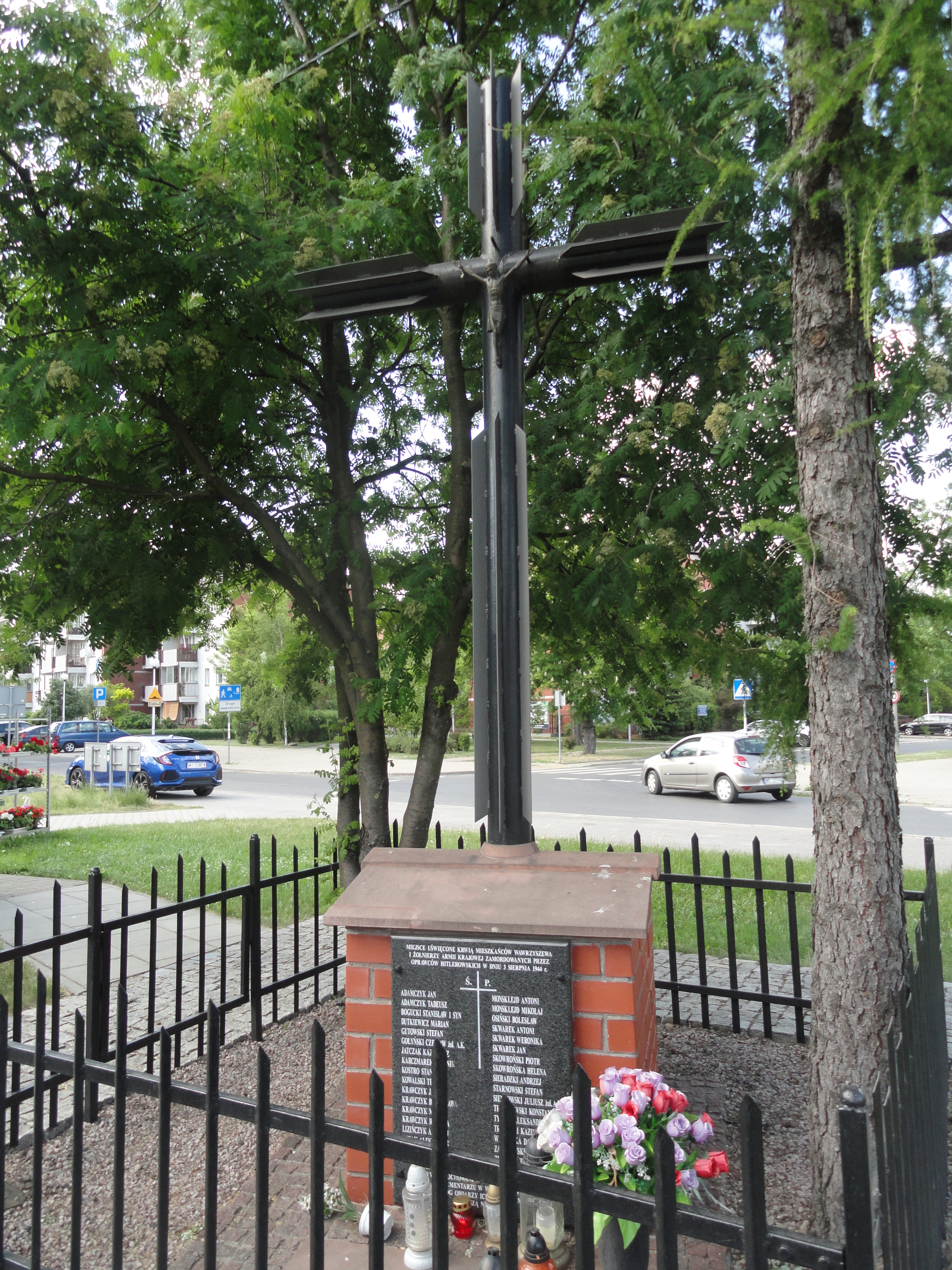
The monument commemorating victims of the Suppression of Wawrzyszew, located at the intersection of Wólczyńska Street and Wolumen Street, in Warsaw, Poland.

The Suppression of Wawrzyszew (Polish: Pacyfikacja Wawrzyszewa) was a pacification operation during the Second World War, enacted by German forces on the population of the village of Wawrzyszew (now part of Warsaw, Poland). It took place on 3 August 1944, during the Warsaw Uprising, and as part of it, 30 inhabitants of the village were killed, the buildings set on fire, and remaining population displaced.

== History ==
Following the beginning of the Warsaw Uprising, between 1 and 2 August 1944, the Polish partisans of the Home Army had attacked the nearby Bielany Aerodrome, which was heavily guarded by German forces. The attack was unsuccessful, ending in a German victory, and retreat of the partisans. There were also clashes in the area of Bielany, including a few small fights in Wawrzyszew. On 3 August 1944, German forces attacked partisants in Bielany, which fought of the attack with heavy losses.

Following the unsuccessful attack, German forces decided to take revenge on the population of the nearby village of Wawrzyszew (now part of Warsaw, Poland). Later that day, German forces, who according to the testimonies of the witnesses were from the Protection Squadron, entered the village. They set buildings on fire, destroyed them with grenades, and expelled the population. People who fought back, or were too slow to leave, were killed at the scene. Additionally, the attackers also executed several men. In total 30 people, including women and children, were killed, while a portion of the village was burned down. The surviving population was displaced.

== Commemorations ==
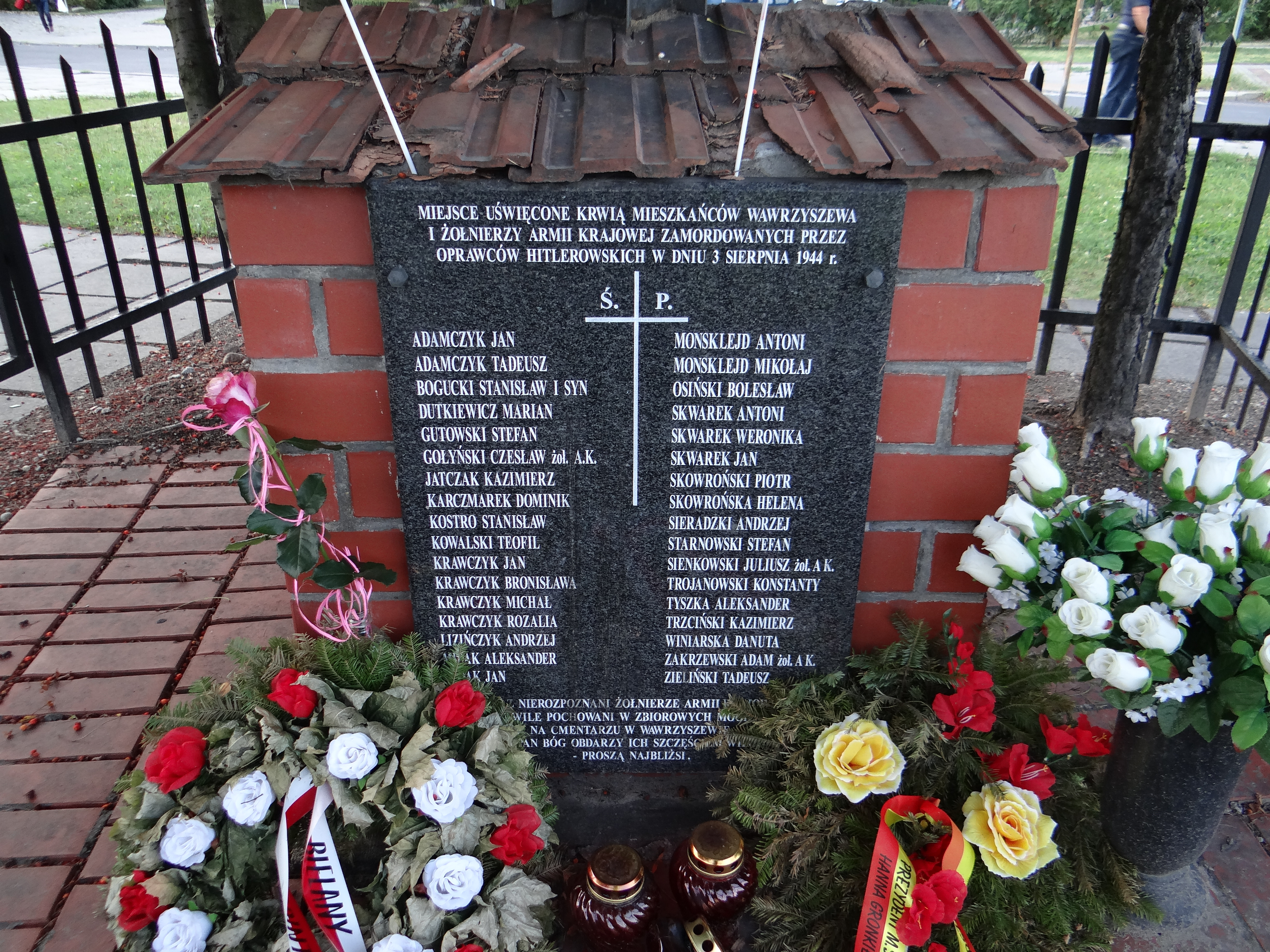
The plaque commemorating the victims of the Suppression of Wawrzyszew.

On 22 November 1992, on the intersection of Wólczyńska Street and Wolumen Street was unveiled a metal Christian cross, and a plaque, commemorating the events of the Suppression of Wawrzyszew. The plaque includes names of 34 identified victims killed during the event, and additionally is dedicated to the unidentified civilians and soldiers of the Home Army, who were buried at the nearby Wawrzyszew Cemetery.
