= Placówka =

Polish film from 1979

- Directed by: Zygmunt Skonieczny
- Based on: The Outpost by Bolesław Prus
- Music by: Adam Walaciński
- Release date: 1 October 1979
- Running time: 84 minutes
- Language: Polish

Placówka is a Polish historical film directed by Zygmunt Skonieczny. It was released in 1979. It is based on the novel The Outpost by Bolesław Prus.
