= Andrzej M. Chołdzyński =

Polish architect

Andrzej Marek Chołdzyński
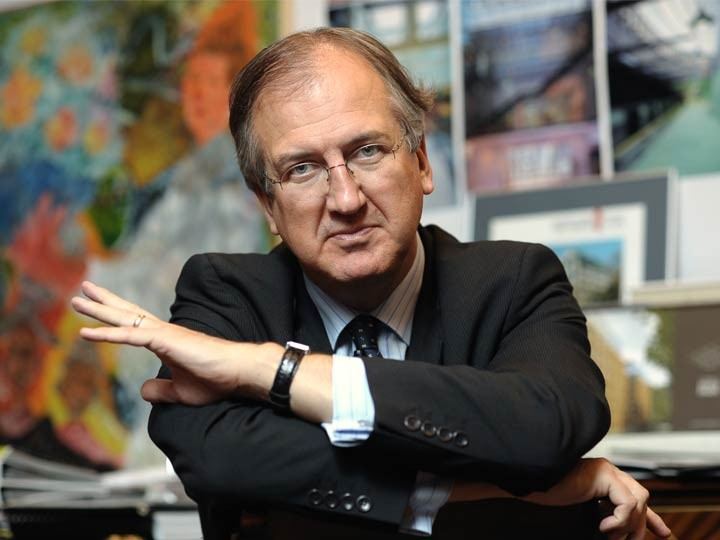
- Andrzej M. Chołdzyński (2013)
- Born: 2 November 1960 (age 65); Lublin, Poland
- Education: Tadeusz Kościuszko University of Technology
- Occupation: Architect
- Practice: AMC – Andrzej M. Chołdzyński
- Website: www.amcholdzynski.pl

Andrzej Marek Chołdzyński (born 2 November 1960 in Lublin) is a Polish architect. He is the designer of Plac Wilsona metro station in Warsaw, the central part of the second Warsaw metro line and the headquarters of the Warsaw Stock Exchange in Warsaw, among others. He was nominated for the European Union Prize for Contemporary Architecture in 2001.

He has lived and worked in Paris since 1982, and simultaneously in Warsaw since 1996.

== Awards and recognition ==
His awards include:

- 2000 - 2001 - Nominated for the first prize in the "Life in Architecture"
- 2001 - Nominated for the annual European Union Prize Foundation Mies van der Rohe in Barcelona
- 2002 - State Award of the first one degree for outstanding creative achievement in the field of Architecture and Construction for the design and construction of the building of the Warsaw Stock Exchange
- 2008 - Title for the best new subway station in the world at the Conference in Copenhagen for the Wilson Square station in Warsaw
- 2008 - The title of the world's best public utility building with reinforced concrete in 2008 - Mexico
- 2000 - Knight of the Order of Polonia Restituta
- 2013 - Special Award of the Polish Builder magazine Hercules in 2012 under the honorary patronage of the Deputy Prime Minister, Minister of Economy; for outstanding creative achievement in the field of architecture, with particular emphasis on the Warsaw metro project. Lifetime Achievement for the development of Polish architecture and construction
