= Wawrzyszew metro station =

Warsaw metro station

Wawrzyszew
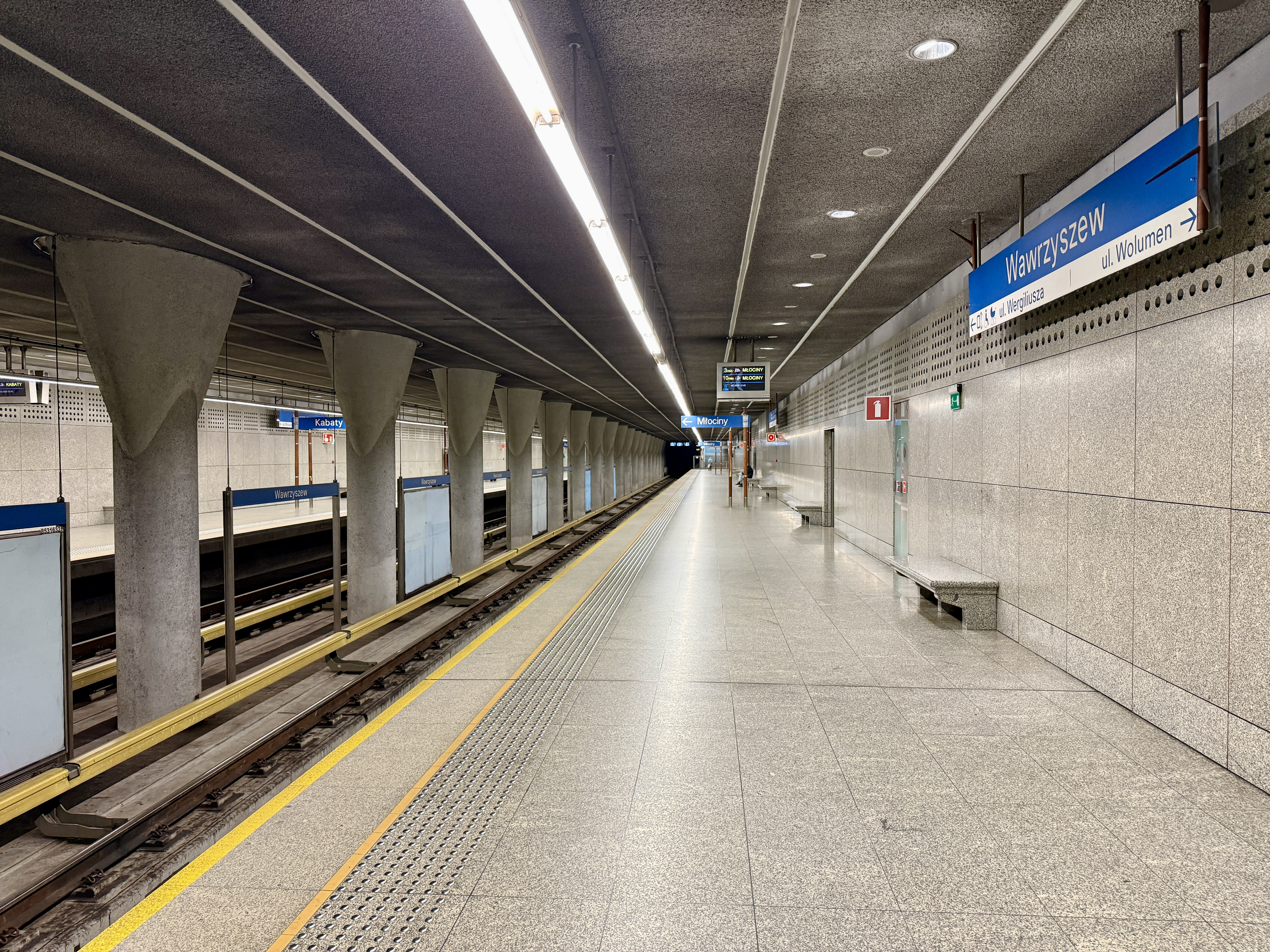

General information
- Coordinates: 52°17′11″N 20°56′22″E
- Owner: Public Transport Authority
- Platforms: 2 side platforms
- Tracks: 2
- Connections: 156, 184, 303; N44

Construction
- Structure type: Underground
- Platform levels: 1
- Accessible: Yes
- Architect: Andrzej M. Chołdzyński

Other information
- Station code: A22
- Fare zone: 1

History
- Opened: 25 October 2008; 17 years ago

Services
Preceding station	Warsaw Metro	Following station
Młociny Terminus	M1 line	Stare Bielany towards Kabaty
Location
- Location within Warsaw

Metro Wawrzyszew, located at the corner of Kasprowicza and Lindego Street, became the 20th working station on Line M1 of the Warsaw Metro when it opened on 25 October 2008 as part of the extension from Słodowiec to Młociny. It was designed by Polish architect Andrzej M. Chołdzyński.

== Gallery ==
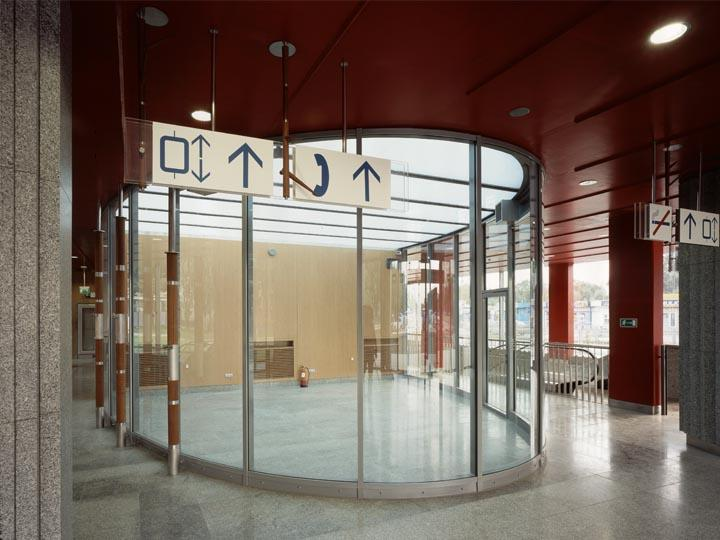
Entrance to the station

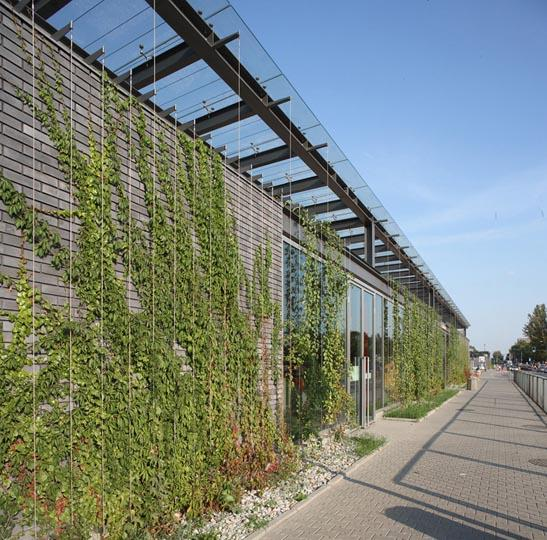
Entrance to the station

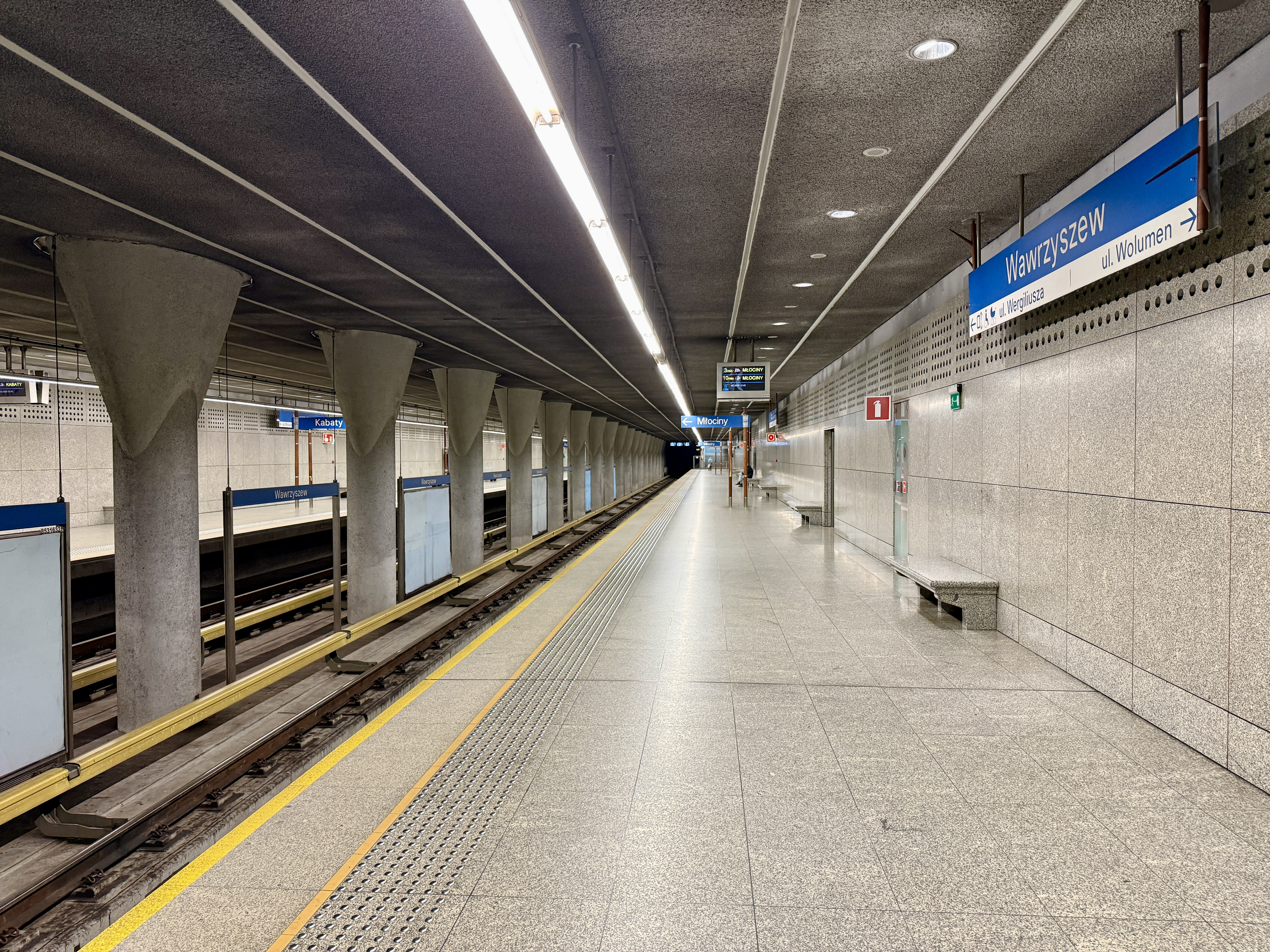
Main platform

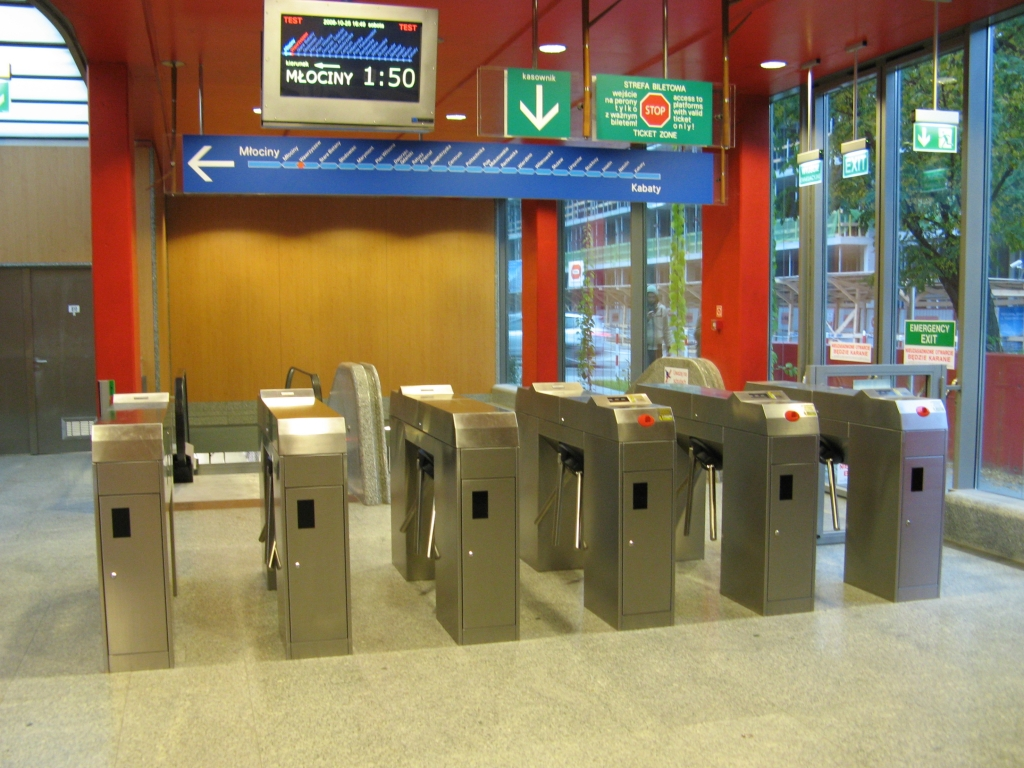
Interior detail
