= Włodzimierz Press =

Polish actor

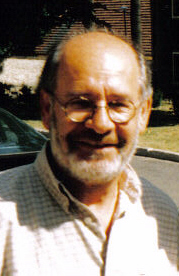
Włodzimierz Press

Włodzimierz Press (born 13 May 1939, in Lwów, Poland (now Lviv, Ukraine)) is a Polish theatre and voice actor, and screenwriter. He is most well known for his role in the television series Czterej pancerni i pies as the Georgian Grigorij "Grześ" Saakaszwili. He also featured in the Polish dubs of shows such as the Looney Tunes, The Smurfs and Curious George.

== Career ==
Born into a Polish Jewish family, he graduated from the National Academy of Dramatic Art in 1963, and later joined the People's Theatre.

Press made his film debut in 1963, appearing in Rozwodów nie będzie. His first writing credit was in 1970 for the film Na dobranoc. In 1992 he began performing on stage at the Studio Theatre in Warsaw.
