= Kampinos Group =

Partisan formation of the Home Army

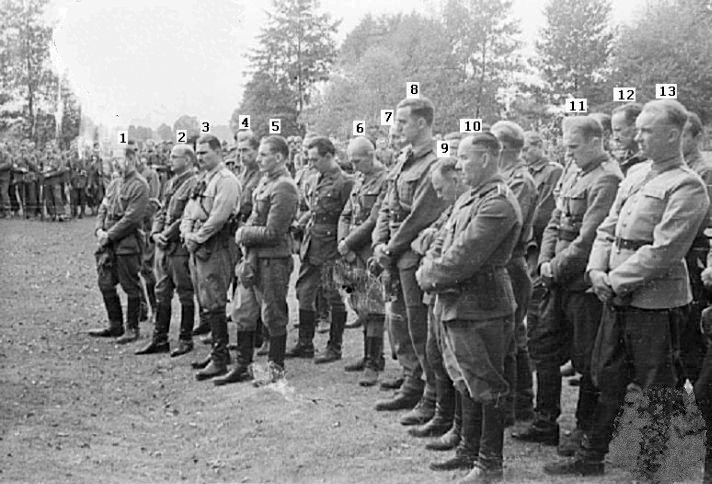
- Officer corps of the Kampinos Group during a field mass in Wiersze
- Active: second half of August, 1944 – 29 September 1944
- Country: Poland
- Allegiance: Północ Group
- Type: ground force
- Engagements: World War II, Warsaw Uprising

Commanders
- Current commander: Captain Józef Szymon Krzyczkowski
- Ceremonial chief: Mayor Alfons Okoń Kotowski

The Kampinos Group was a partisan formation of the Home Army fighting in the Kampinos Forest during the Warsaw Uprising of 1944.

The Kampinos Group was formed based on the structures of the VIII District of the Warsaw County Subdistrict of the Warsaw District, as well as various units of the Home Army that found themselves in the Kampinos Forest as a result of the Operation Tempest. In August and September 1944, the group tied up significant enemy forces, thereby relieving the besieged Warsaw. Its units fought in 47 battles and skirmishes and temporarily liberated the central and eastern parts of the forest from German occupation, inhabited by several thousand people. Over 900 soldiers of the Kampinos Group also set out to aid the capital, taking part in attacks on the Warszawa Gdańska railway station and in the defense of Żoliborz.

At the end of September 1944, the Kampinos Group attempted to break through to the Świętokrzyskie Mountains. Initially, the Polish formation effectively evaded the German encirclement, but due to command errors, it was surrounded and defeated on September 29 near Jaktorów. However, many Home Army soldiers, including several cohesive units, managed to break out of the encirclement. Some of them continued to fight until January 1945.

== Origins ==
=== Conspiracy in the Kampinos Forest ===
Already at the turn of 1939 and 1940, just a few months after the Invasion of Poland, the first cells of the Polish resistance movement began to emerge in the Kampinos Forest area. By mid-1940, most of these groups had subordinated themselves to the Union of Armed Struggle (renamed the Home Army in February 1942). The structures of the Union of Armed Struggle/Home Army from the pre-war areas of Czosnów, Gmina Młociny, and the eastern part of Gmina Zaborów became part of the VIII Łęgów District of the Warsaw County Subdistrict of the Warsaw District. Thus, the VIII District encompassed the eastern part of the Kampinos Forest and villages scattered on both sides of the Warsaw–Modlin road within its territorial scope. The conditions of underground work in the Łęgów District were significantly influenced by the fact that its southern part belonged territorially to the Warsaw District of the General Government, while the northern part was annexed into the Reich as part of the so-called Zichenau. The border between the Nazi Germany and the General Government was guarded by numerous border guard posts.

The first commander of the VIII District was Lieutenant Andrzej Niedzielski, alias "Andrzej". In September 1941, he was replaced by Captain Józef Krzyczkowski, alias "Szymon". At the turn of 1940 and 1941, (according to other sources only in 1942) in the Warsaw County Subdistrict, the creation of so-called line units began, modeled on the structure of a regular army. The previous organizational structure, based on small underground cells (so-called "fives"), was replaced by a division into squads and platoons, and eventually also into companies and battalions. In the autumn of 1943, the VIII District already had 953 sworn soldiers organized into five infantry companies and three independent platoons (communications, sappers, and gendarmerie). In addition, at the end of 1942, the district command established the Kedyw unit. Initially, it was in the form of a squad, but already in the first half of 1943, it grew to the size of a platoon (about 40 soldiers). Due to the increasing number of "burned" conspirators in the winter of 1943 and 1944, a small partisan unit was organized in the Kampinos Forest area under the command of Second Lieutenant Antoni Frydrych, alias "Parys". Initially, the unit consisted of only a few partisans, but over time its strength grew to about 30 soldiers. The partisans were quartered in makeshift dugouts on the so-called Strzeleckie Łąki near Sieraków, and organizationally, they were subordinate to the commander of the Kedyw of the VIII District.

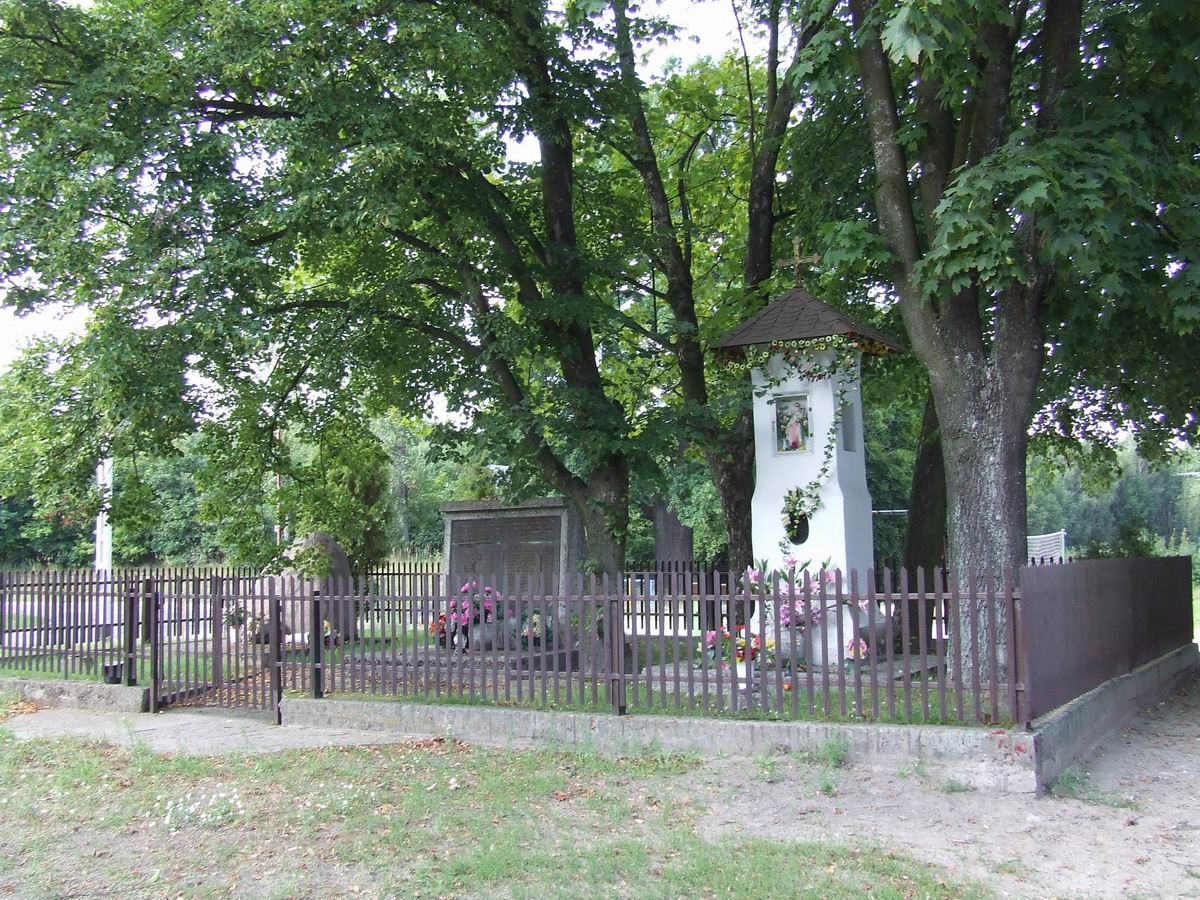
Monument in Sieraków commemorating villagers killed during World War II

In the early years of the occupation, the underground activity in the VIII District mainly focused on gathering weapons and ammunition, conducting military training for sworn soldiers, intelligence work, and informational-propaganda activities. Over time, sabotage-diversion actions were also organized, and traitors, informants, and common criminals were punished or eliminated. For almost three years, the VIII District developed its underground activity without significant opposition from the Germans. However, with the increase in the number and activity of conspirators, the number of "leaks" and arrests also increased. Inevitably, there were losses during combat actions. The conditions of underground work deteriorated significantly from June 1943 when a unit of German gendarmerie specialized in combating the resistance movement was quartered in Zaborów. In November 1943, as a result of betrayal by one of the conspirators, dozens of people – soldiers of the VIII District and members of their families – were arrested. Eight residents of Truskaw and Izabelin were then burned alive by Zaborów gendarmes. As a result of the series of arrests, the 1st and 5th companies of the VIII District suffered such heavy losses that it became necessary to merge them into one company. On 28 January 1944, a clandestine weapons depot located in the Opaleń forest fell into the hands of the Germans. Another severe blow was the death of the commander of the Kedyw of the VIII District, Second Lieutenant Marian Grobelny, alias "Macher", and four other soldiers shot by Zaborów gendarmes in an ambush near Sieraków (24 June 1944).

Ultimately, the Germans failed to break or paralyze the structures of the VIII District. On the eve of the Warsaw Uprising, Captain "Szymon" could deploy two infantry battalions with the strength of five frontline companies. Within the district, there were also two platoons of the Military Service of the Uprising Protection and structures of the Military Women's Service. In July 1944, "Szymon" was additionally assigned two youth platoons led by officer cadets Janusz Warmiński, alias "Murzyn", and Wojciech Pecyński, alias "Polana", which – although composed of young boys from the Dąbrowa Leśna and Łomianki areas, therefore from the territory of the VIII District – were previously subordinate to the command of the III Dęby District of the Warsaw County Subdistrict (Rembertów). At the same time, preparations for the insurgent action began, including the gathering of weapons and ammunition. However, arming remained the Achilles' heel of the VIII District. "Szymon" stated in his post-war memoirs that after the mobilization in July 1944, there were only about 350–400 armed soldiers in the ranks of the VIII District's units. On the other hand, Edward Bonarowski claimed that the forces of the Łęgów District did not exceed the number of 440 armed soldiers, usually equipped with weapons from the Invasion of Poland.

The plans for a general uprising developed by the Home Army command envisaged that the main task of the VIII District would be to seize the Bielany airfield. This facility was to be captured in cooperation with units of the III District of the Żoliborz Subdistrict. In addition, the VIII District was tasked with seizing the Łomianki factory and workshops in Dziekanów Leśny, taking over transportation means on the Vistula river, and blocking the Modlin road at the Młociny Forest. It was also planned that after the arrival of reinforcements from the Błonie District, offensive actions would be conducted towards Kazuń Nowy.

=== Arrival of the Stowbtsy-Naliboki Group ===
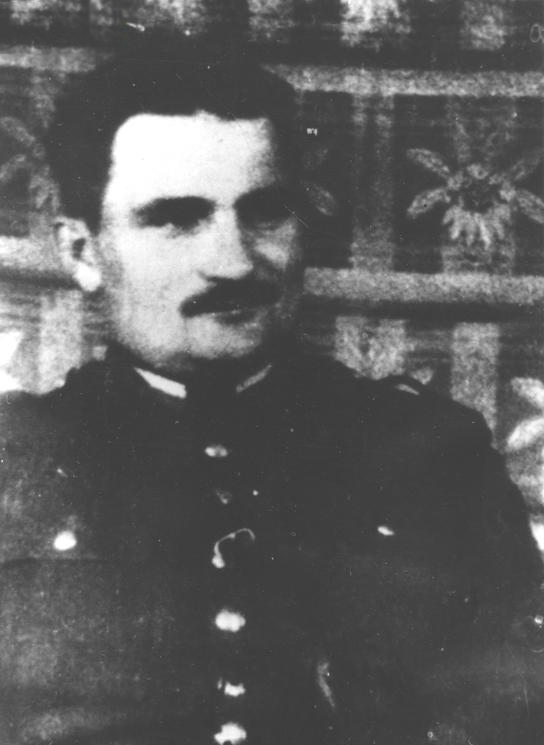
Adolf Pilch, alias "Góra"/"Dolina"

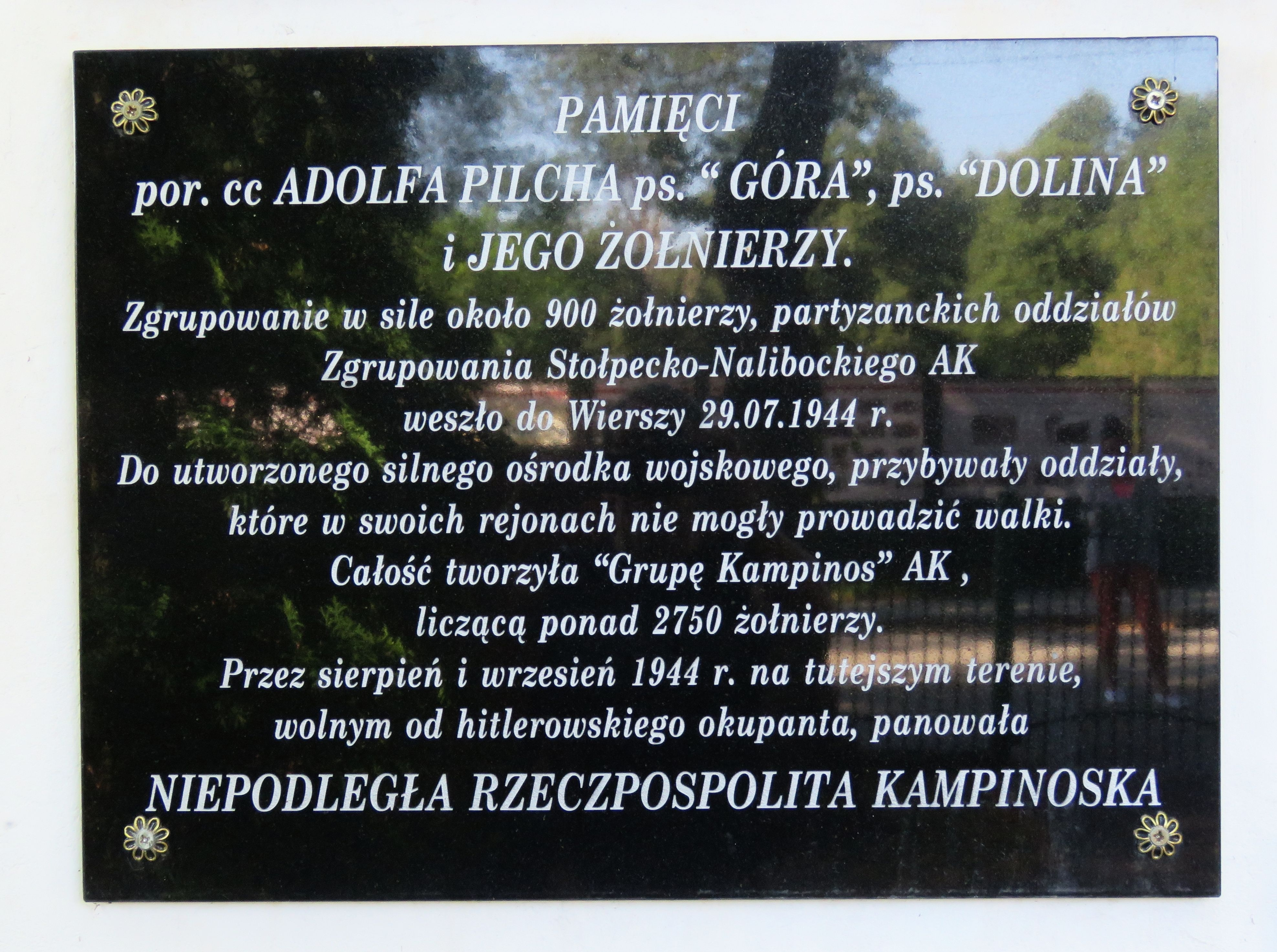
Plaque on the wall of the church in Wiersze, commemorating the participation of Lieutenant Pilch and his soldiers in battles in the Kampinos Forest

During the night of 25/26 July 1944, (Note: In his memoirs published in the early 1960s, Józef Krzyczkowski reported that the Stowbtsy-Naliboki Group stood down in Dziekanów Polski on 24 July 1944, but this is an obvious mistake (Krzyczkowski (1962, p. 161)).) Captain "Szymon" received a message that a several hundred strong unit had stopped in Dziekanów Polski, which soldiers were dressed in uniforms of the pre-war Polish Armed Forces and spoke Polish with a Northern Borderlands dialect. The next day, the commander of the VIII District went to Dziekanów to personally assess the situation. On the spot, he learned that the Stowbtsy-Naliboki Home Army Group had arrived from the Naliboki forest in the Eastern Borderlands. The group consisted of 861 well-armed (Note: On 26 July 1944, the equipment of the Naliboki group included: 7 grenade launchers, 11 medium machine guns, 41 light machine guns, 43 ten-shot rifles, 53 submachine guns, 627 rifles, 137 pistols, 794 grenades, and 195,500 rounds of ammunition. Additionally, the group had 589 horses, 320 saddles, 185 carts, and 8 horse-drawn carts (Podgóreczny (2010, pp. 5–6); Pilch (2013, p. 180)).) and battle-hardened partisans, organized into an infantry battalion, a cavalry squadron, a heavy machine gun squadron, and logistical support. It was led by Lieutenant Adolf Pilch, alias "Góra" (a Silent Unseen paratrooper).

The Stowbtsy-Naliboki Group was formed based on the Polish Partisan Unit named after Tadeusz Kościuszko, established in June 1943 in the Stowbtsy County in the Nowogródek Voivodeship. In the first months of its existence, the unit engaged in intense combat with the Germans, cooperating with Soviet partisans. However, the situation changed dramatically in December 1943 when Soviet partisans deceitfully kidnapped the command of the Polish group and then proceeded to disarm and liquidate subunits without officers. Lieutenant "Góra", who took command of the remnants of the unit, aimed to save the soldiers and provide protection to the Polish population against the terror of the Soviet partisans. With the consent of the command of the Nowogródek Home Army District, he decided to temporarily cease hostilities with the Germans. This decision allowed "Góra" to rebuild the group and continue the fight against the Soviets. In the summer of 1944, the rapid advances of the Red Army led to the loss of communication with the district command and prevented the group from participating in Operation Ostra Brama. In this situation, Lieutenant "Góra" decided to evacuate his units to central Poland, which also meant breaking the ceasefire with the Germans. During the nearly month-long march, sneaking between the broken German units on the Eastern Front, the group covered a distance of several hundred kilometers, crossing the Neman, Shchara, and Bug rivers along the way. The climax of the journey occurred on July 25 when "Góra's" soldiers, thanks to a clever military ruse, crossed the heavily guarded bridge over the Vistula near Nowy Dwór Mazowiecki without a fight. Ultimately, after midnight on July 26, the Naliboki group, with the knowledge and consent of the Germans, arrived in Dziekanów Polski.

During the march and upon arrival in the Warsaw area, Lieutenant "Góra" unsuccessfully attempted to establish contact with the Home Army command. The conspiratorial circles received the lieutenant and his soldiers with great mistrust. There were probably fears that the presence of a unit accused of collaborating with the Germans on the eve of the planned uprising might hinder cooperation with the Red Army. Initially, the command of the Warsaw County Subdistrict considered forcibly disarming the Naliboki group or buying weapons from its soldiers. On July 27, however, the Home Army High Command, through Captain "Szymon", ordered Lieutenant "Góra" to march to the Tuchola Forest in the Gdańsk Pomerania, announcing at the same time that he himself would face a drumhead court-martial for collaboration with the Germans. This order, which Stanisław Podlewski later described as "mad and insane", in practice condemned the group to destruction because the Borderland soldiers had no chance of penetrating hundreds of kilometers into German-controlled territory. In this situation, Lieutenant Pilch informed Captain "Szymon" that he could not carry out the Home Army High Command's order. He proposed instead that he and his entire group be placed under his command.

"Szymon" quickly embraced this proposal. He shared "Góra's" opinion on the senselessness of marching to the Tuchola Forest and also realized that subordinating the Stowbtsy-Naliboki Group would increase his forces by nearly 900 well-armed and battle-hardened partisans. Such a solution would change the previous balance of power in the eastern part of the Kampinos Forest, and the Łęgów District would have a chance to carry out the tasks imposed by the insurgent plans. "Szymon" then contacted the Home Army High Command again, proposing to incorporate "Góra's" units into the VIII District. Ultimately, the Home Army High Command accepted "Szymon's" proposal, but stipulated that he assumed command of the Naliboki group "at his own risk".

Thanks to the subordination of the Naliboki group, the strength of the VIII District increased, according to Jerzy Koszada's calculations, to 2092 soldiers (Note: Józef Krzyczkowski provided slightly different numbers in his memoirs. According to his estimates, on the eve of the Warsaw Uprising, there were 1,949 soldiers in the ranks of the VIII District (30 officers, 267 non-commissioned officers, 1,505 privates, 147 women). The information provided by Krzyczkowski regarding the armament of the VIII District's units also differs slightly from the findings of Jerzy Koszada (Krzyczkowski (1962, pp. 175–176)).) (32 officers, 294 non-commissioned officers, 1480 privates, 286 women). The armament of the district's units included: 7 grenade launchers, 13 medium machine guns, 47 light machine guns, 61 submachine guns, 1046 rifles, 175 pistols, 1044 grenades, 367 incendiary bottles, and 239,000 rounds of ammunition.

== Battle trail ==
=== First battles ===
After being incorporated into the VIII District, the Naliboki units remained in Dziekanowo Polskie for a short time to exploit the Germans' belief that they were dealing with a collaborationist unit and to obtain as much ammunition, medicine, and dressing materials from the Modlin Fortress garrison as possible. When the enemy realized the deception, Captain "Szymon" ordered the Naliboki group to move to the area of the villages of Wiersze and Truskawka in the central part of the Kampinos Forest (July 29). Along the way, "Góra's" soldiers were to eliminate German gendarmerie and border guard posts. Around the same time, "Szymon" decided to mobilize part of the Kampinos subunits of the VIII District (July 28). The presence of over a thousand armed partisans in a relatively small forest area soon led to a series of clashes with German units quartered in the vicinity. The most serious engagement occurred in Aleksandrów, where on the morning of July 31, the Naliboki units completely routed a Wehrmacht company, killing nearly 50 Germans and capturing a considerable amount of weapons and ammunition. According to Józef Krzyczkowski and Adolf Pilch, this battle effectively marked the beginning of the uprising in the Kampinos Forest.

The order from the commander of the Warsaw District of the Home Army regarding the start of the uprising reached "Szymon" on August 1 at 3:00 PM. Due to the fact that this occurred just two hours before the designated "W" Hour, there was little chance that all of the VIII District's forces could complete their concentration and strike at the Bielany airfield in time. Fearing that the inaction of the Kampinos units would allow the Germans to redirect all forces to fight against the units of the Żoliborz District, Captain "Szymon" decided not to wait for the concentration to finish and ordered the nearest I Battalion, commanded by Lieutenant Janusz Langner, alias "Janusz", to attack. The partially mobilized battalion could only field 190 soldiers, while the airfield garrison was estimated to consist of about 700 well-armed soldiers. In these circumstances, the Polish attack was purely demonstrative. After a two-hour firefight, "Janusz's" battalion withdrew to the Łuże Mountain area, losing 5 killed and 12 wounded.

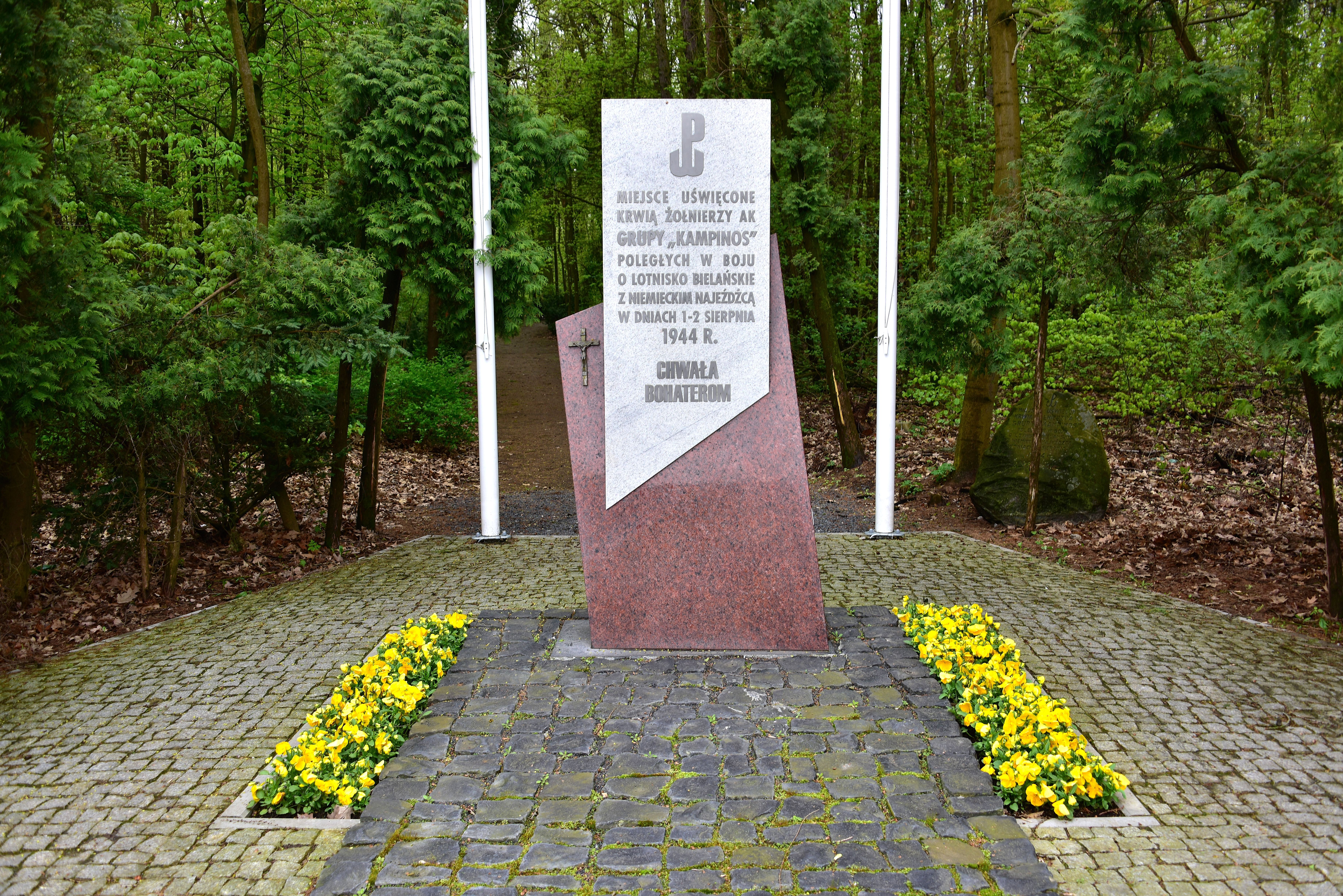
A memorial site on Michalina Street in Warsaw dedicated to Home Army soldiers killed in attacks on Bielany airfield

Meanwhile, during the night of August 1 and 2, the main forces of the VIII District completed their concentration in the area of Hill 103 in Łuże Mountain. In the morning, "Szymon" launched his units into another attack on the airfield. However, alerted by earlier clashes, the enemy remained vigilant and was not caught off guard. Well-fortified and with a firepower advantage, the Germans repelled all Polish attacks that morning. After hours of fighting, the Home Army units, threatened by a flanking attack from the Modlińska Road, were forced to withdraw to the Łuże area. The VIII District suffered heavy losses, amounting to 31 killed and 45 wounded. Among the fallen were Lieutenant "Janusz" and two company commanders, while Captain "Szymon" was seriously wounded. A significant portion of the ammunition reserves was also expended. As a result of this defeat, the Home Army units in the Kampinos Forest remained unable to conduct significant offensive operations until mid-August 1944. Nevertheless, the German command soon issued an order to destroy the Bielany airfield. Some Polish historians and veterans were convinced that it was the attacks of the VIII District that prompted the Germans to abandon the use of the base.

While the main forces of the VIII District were advancing towards the Bielany airfield, three squadrons of the 1st Squadron of the 27th Uhlan Regiment of the Home Army attempted to block the Modlińska Road. In ambushes near Pieńków and Buraków, the Uhlans killed approximately 34–41 Germans and destroyed 17 vehicles. However, lacking anti-tank weapons, the cavalrymen had to withdraw when German tanks appeared on the road.

After the unsuccessful attack on the airfield, the units of the VIII District withdrew deeper into the Kampinos Forest, to the area around the villages of Wiersze, Truskawka, Janówek, and Krogulec. On August 3, near Truskawka, Polish forces surprised and completely destroyed a German unit of approximately company strength. At a relatively low cost in casualties, Polish soldiers killed nearly 70 Germans and captured several more. On the same day, troopers from the 2nd Squadron of the 27th Uhlan Regiment engaged and defeated a small Wehrmacht unit that was conducting requisitions in villages within Kampinos. Both victories significantly boosted morale among the Kampinos units of the Home Army, which had been shaken by the earlier defeat at the Bielany airfield.

On August 3, based on the Kampinos units of the VIII District and the units of the Naliboki Group, the Home Army Palmiry-Młociny Regiment was formed. The depleted I Kampinos Battalion was merged with the reserve II Battalion commanded by Captain Stanisław Nowosad, alias "Dulka". Severely wounded, "Szymon" handed over command of the regiment "during combat action" to Lieutenant Pilch, who was already operating under the code name "Dolina". He reserved for himself the "assignment of combat tasks and overall leadership". In the same order, "Szymon" also ordered the regiment to move to the area of Sieraków, Truskaw and Izabelin. The relocation was carried out according to the order. However, after four days, "Szymon" again ordered the units to withdraw deep into the Kampinos Forest, hoping that this would protect them from being cut off from the forest, facilitate the receipt of Allied airdrops, and prevent Warsaw refugees from exerting a demoralizing influence on the soldiers. Commanding the Kampinos Battalion, Captain "Dulka" received an order to demobilize all unarmed soldiers. At the request of the battalion commander, this order was soon modified to leave those soldiers in the ranks who expressed such a desire, while returning the weapons of those reservists who decided to return home.

Before the withdrawal, Polish units were to attack German outposts along the road between Leszno and Stare Babice. In the evening of August 7, the Naliboki infantry battalion under the command of Lieutenant Witold Pełczyński, alias "Witold", and the cavalry squadron under the command of Lieutenant Zdzisław Nurkiewicz, alias "Nieczaj", partially drove the Germans out of Borzęcin Duży, Zaborów and Zaborówek. Meanwhile, the poorly armed Kampinos Battalion, which was attacking between Zielonki and Zalesie, withdrew from the fight on the orders of Captain "Dulka" when a German reconnaissance aircraft appeared in the sky. Later that same night, "Dulka" convened his officers for a meeting in Sieraków, during which he pointed out the critical situation of the uprising in his opinion and announced that due to a lack of trust from superiors, (Note: Captain Stanisław Nowosad, alias "Dulka," was assigned to the VIII District shortly before the outbreak of the uprising. His relationship with Captain "Szymon" was not smooth from the beginning. Adam Borkiewicz speculated that "Dulka's" decision to dissolve the battalion may have been influenced by his alleged bitterness over "Szymon's" decision to entrust command of the "Palmiry-Młociny" Regiment to Lieutenant "Dolina" (Bonarowski (2014, pp. 43–44); Borkiewicz (1969, p. 147)).) he was relinquishing command of the battalion. When none of the officers volunteered to take command, "Dulka" ordered the dissolution of the battalion. That same night, nearly 600 soldiers left the ranks. Some of the insurgents wishing to continue the fight joined other units. As a result of the dissolution of the Kampinos Battalion, the strength of the Palmiry-Młociny Regiment decreased from 2,000 soldiers to around 1,400.

In the following days, the regiment's units skirmished with the Germans near Buda and Truskaw (August 8), as well as near Brzozówka (August 10) and Leoncin (August 11/12).

=== Beginning of the Kampinos Group ===
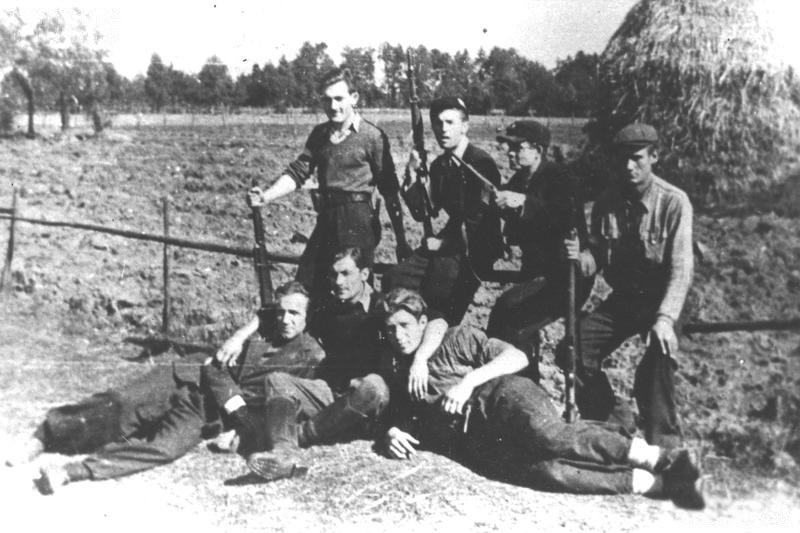
Soldiers of the so-called Sochaczew Battalion of the Kampinos Group, originating from the Western Subdistrict of the Home Army "Hajduki"

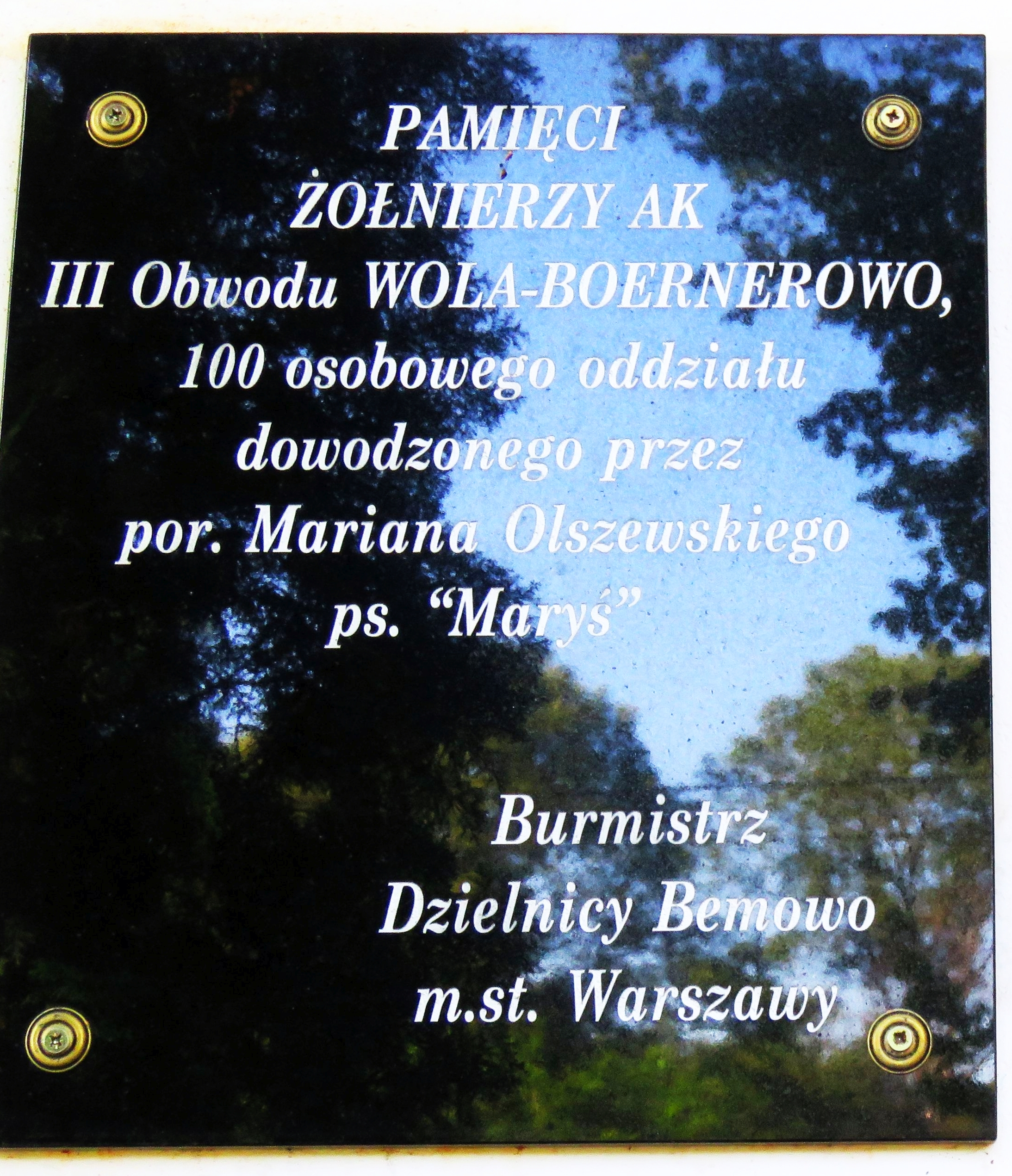
Plaque on the wall of the church in Wiersze, commemorating the soldiers of the Wola Subdistrict who fought in the ranks of the Kampinos Group

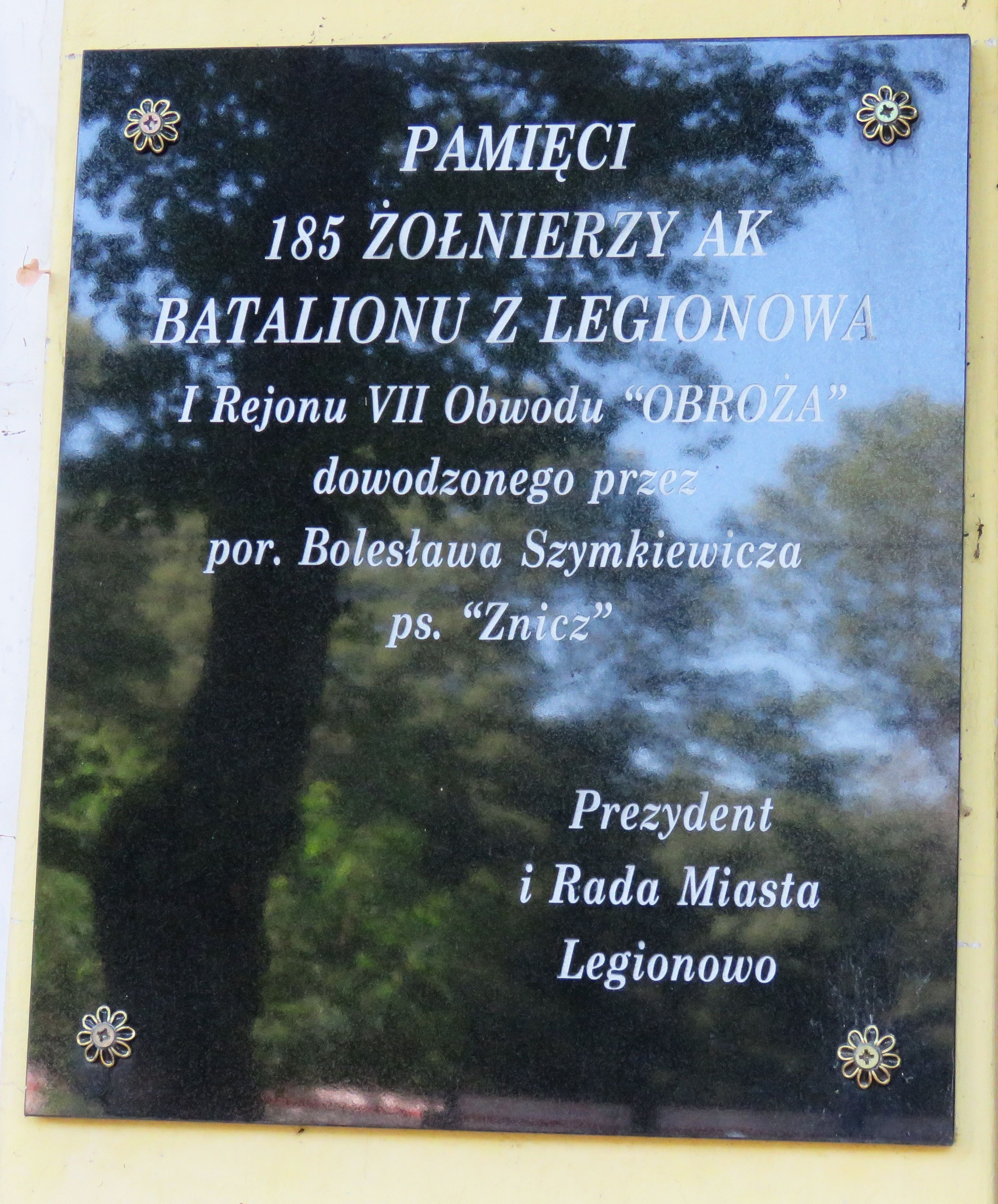
Plaque on the wall of the church in Wiersze, commemorating the soldiers of the Legion Battalion fighting in the ranks of the Kampinos Group

The presence of a strong partisan group led to the influx of individual soldiers and cohesive units of the Home Army from various districts of Warsaw into the Kampinos Forest after the outbreak of the Warsaw Uprising. They included those who left the city after the initial Polish attacks during "W" Hour. Gradually, units from other areas of the Warsaw County Subdistrict and neighboring areas of the Western Subdistrict of the Warsaw Home Army District (code-named "Hallerowo"/"Hajduki") also arrived.

- On August 2, a company from Wiersze, led by Lieutenant Franciszek Wiszniowski, alias "Jurek" (1 officer, 75 non-commissioned officers, and soldiers), joined. This unit formally belonged to the Western Subdistrict of the Warsaw Home Army.
- On August 4, a unit led by Lieutenant Marian Olszewski, alias "Maryś", consisting of 2 officers and 98 soldiers from the 1st District of the Wola Subdistrict, joined. Due to the enemy's advantage and lack of weapons caused by the Germans' occupation of warehouses in Ulrychów, this unit could not carry out its insurgent tasks during "W" Hour and withdrew to the Kampinos Forest on the night of August 1/2.
- On August 7, the Zemsta Company, led by Second Lieutenant Jerzy Dudziec, alias "Puchała", joined. It comprised soldiers from the Bojowa Dywersja of the 7th Rejon Jelsk of the Warsaw County Subdistrict (Ożarów Mazowiecki). This unit included 1 officer and 49 non-commissioned officers and soldiers.
- Around August 10, a sapper team led by Second Lieutenant Bolesław Janulis, alias "Juriewicz", consisting of 1 officer and 11 non-commissioned officers and soldiers, joined. This subunit was previously part of the command platoon of the Uhlan Jeleń Division of the Home Army. After an unsuccessful attack during "W" Hour on the heavily fortified "police district" in South Śródmieście, the soldiers under "Juriewicz" withdrew to the Kabaty Woods and then to the Kampinos Forest.
- On August 11, a company led by Captain Wilhelm Kosiński, alias "Mścisław", appeared near Wiersze. It was formed from soldiers of the Sochaczew District of the Western Subdistrict of the Home Army "Hajduki". In the following days, several hundred soldiers from the Hajduki Subdistrict (Sochaczew and Błonie districts) arrived in the Kampinos Forest. They were organized into the Sochaczew Battalion, led by Captain Władysław Starzyk, alias "Korwin", who was previously the commander of the Sochaczew District. By the end of September, the battalion consisted of 30 officers and 451 non-commissioned officers and soldiers.
- Around August 14, a platoon led by Lieutenant Henryk Małowiecki, alias "Ran", consisting of 1 officer and 47 non-commissioned officers and soldiers, joined. This unit was previously part of the 5th District of the 6th Praga Subdistrict. Around August 9, after the final suppression of the uprising in the right-bank Warsaw, the "Ran" platoon began to retreat to the Kampinos Forest.
- Around August 15, a cavalry platoon led by Second Lieutenant Zygmunt Koc, alias "Dąbrowa", consisting of 1 officer and 20 non-commissioned officers and soldiers, joined. This unit was formed in 1943 on the estate in Wilków, where "Dąbrowa" found employment after the September defeat. After joining the Kampinos Group, the platoon became part of the 4th Squadron of the 1st Division of the 27th Ulhan Regiment of the Home Army, and "Dąbrowa" himself became the deputy commander of the squadron.
- On August 17, a platoon of "Orliks" from the 6th Rejon Helenów of the Warsaw County Subdistrict (Pruszków), led by Second Lieutenant Tadeusz Nowicki, alias "Orlik," consisting of 1 officer and 47 non-commissioned officers and soldiers, joined. After the collapse of the insurgent action in the Helenów District, the "Orlik" platoon retreated to the forests of Sękocin and Chojnowo, from where they reached the Kampinos Forest. In September, it was incorporated into Lieutenant "Lawa's" aviation company.
- On August 18, a platoon under the command of Lieutenant Tadeusz Gaworski, alias "Lawa", consisting of about 30–40 soldiers from the Aviation Department of the Home Army General Staff (known as the aviation platoon), joined. Having missed the tragically ended attack of the Home Army's Garłuch Regiment on Okęcie Airport, the "Lawa" unit moved to the forests of Sękocin and Chojnowo, from where it departed for the Kampinos Forest on the night of August 13/14. On August 27, the platoon was transformed into an independent special tasks aviation company.
- On August 24, the Jerzyki Company of Special Combat Units under the command of Lieutenant Jerzy Strzałkowski, alias "Jerzy", joined with approximately 120 officers and soldiers. The company had previously fought in the Old Town of Warsaw, and after reaching Żoliborz through the sewers, it moved to the Kampinos Forest.
- On September 4, several soldiers from the Zemsta Company of the Pięść Battalion, led by Lieutenant Stefan Matuszczyk, alias "Porawa", joined. They had previously fought in Wola and the Old Town, and then made their way to Żoliborz through the sewers on August 27 and September 2. Based on Lieutenant "Porawa's" unit, the Zemsta Company was soon reconstituted.
- On September 8, after a two-day crossing of the Vistula, approximately 200 soldiers under the command of Lieutenant Bolesław Szymkiewicz, alias "Znicz", from the 1st Marianowo District in the Warsaw County Subdistrict (Legionowo), arrived in the Kampinos Forest. The "Znicz" unit henceforth became known as the Legion Battalion.

Based on the Palmiry-Młociny Regiment and the arriving units in the forest, the Kampinos Group was formed in mid-August. At its peak, it consisted of 2,700 to 3,000 soldiers and 700 horses. Some sources suggest that upon the transformation of the Warsaw insurgent units into the Warsaw Corps of the Home Army on 20 September 1944, the Kampinos Group became part of the fighting 8th Infantry Division of the Home Army named after Romuald Traugutt, serving as its 13th Infantry Regiment. However, Grzegorz Jasiński questions this, arguing that the mentioned reorganization only affected units fighting in the capital.

Additionally, it is worth mentioning that around August 3–4, approximately 160 soldiers from the 3rd District of the 2nd Home Army Żoliborz Subdistrict, commanded by Captain Władysław Nowakowski, alias "Serb", arrived in the Kampinos Forest. On August 26, a several dozen-strong unit of the communist People's Army, under the command of Lieutenant Teodor Kufel, alias "Teoch," appeared in Wiersze. Both units did not subordinate themselves to the command of the Kampinos Group.

=== Relief attempt for Warsaw ===
The Home Army command had high hopes for the presence of a strong partisan group in the Kampinos Forest. Already on August 7, the Home Army High Command subordinated all Home Army units operating in the forest to Captain "Szymon", instructing him to form a unit composed of the most experienced soldiers and officers and then send it to the area of the Wola cemeteries with the task of establishing contact with the Radosław Group fighting there. However, "Szymon" received this order only the next day, i.e., when the units of the Palmiry-Młociny Regiment had completed their retreat to the Wiersze area. Due to the exhaustion of the soldiers and the shortage of weapons and ammunition, the commander of the VIII District deemed the Home Army High Command's order temporarily impossible to execute. He decided to postpone sending reinforcements to Warsaw until the receipt of Allied airdrops with weapons and ammunition. On the nights of August 9/10 and 10/11, the first airdrops were received, significantly arming the forest Home Army units. However, "Szymon" still believed that his units were not ready to go to battle in the capital. This conviction was further reinforced by reconnaissance results, which incorrectly indicated that the Radosław Group units had already withdrawn from the area of the Wola cemeteries.

"Szymon's" actions caused dissatisfaction among the insurgent command. As a result, it was decided to send a combat-ready and energetic officer to the Kampinos Forest with the task of activating local Home Army units. Major Alfons Kotowski, alias "Okoń", the former commander of the Pięść Battalion, was chosen for this role. However, during his attempt to escape from the city, "Okoń" encountered numerous difficulties and as a result, only managed to reach Wiersze on the night of August 15/16. Meanwhile, a serious competence dispute erupted among the officers present in the forest. While the eastern part of the forest, territorially belonging to the pre-war Warsaw County, was part of the Warsaw County Subdistrict, the remaining part of the forest – including its central area where the Kampinos Group units were stationed – was located in the pre-war counties of Sochaczew and Błonie, which were part of the "Hajduki" Western Subdistrict of the Home Army. Under this pretext, the "Hajduki" commander, Lieutenant Colonel Franciszek Jachieć, alias "Roman", and his representative in the Kampinos Forest, Lieutenant Colonel Ludwik Konarski, alias "Wiktor"/"Victor", attempted to subordinate all Kampinos units to themselves. However, "Szymon" and "Dolina", referring to orders received from the Home Army High Command a few days earlier, staunchly refused to relinquish command.

In the meantime, Colonel Karol Ziemski, alias "Wachnowski", to whom the insurgent units in Żoliborz and the Kampinos Forest were subordinated as part of the Home Army's Północ Group, attempted to organize relief for the besieged Warsaw Old Town, under attack by the Germans. With no communication with Major "Okoń" and unaware of the difficulties he encountered while attempting to reach Żoliborz, Ziemski decided not to wait for further developments and to compel the Kampinos units to immediately set off for Warsaw. On August 14, he sent a radio message to "Szymon", ordering him to form a strike force from the ranks of the Kampinos Group and transfer it to the Wola cemeteries area in case "Okoń" was absent. From there, part of the "forest" fighters was to advance towards Stawki Street and Muranów, while the rest was to capture the northern part of Okopowa Street in Wola. The next evening, the Kampinos Group sent a well-armed relief force to Warsaw, consisting of the Żoliborz unit under Captain "Serb" (160 soldiers), the Sochaczew Company commanded by Captain "Mścisław" (about 110–150 soldiers), and a detached infantry battalion from the Palmiry-Młociny Regiment under Lieutenant "Witold" (over 450 soldiers). After a "lengthy, very unpleasant conversation", it was agreed that the relief force would depart under the overall command of Lieutenant Colonel "Victor". Upon arrival in the Powązki area, individual units would carry out tasks independently. However, "Victor" questioned Colonel Ziemski's order regarding a nighttime attack on Stawki Street, deciding that only reconnaissance by combat would be conducted there. After three hours of marching, the Polish column reached Powązki, where a unit of German pioneers was stationed. "Victor" chose not to risk a nighttime battle, and after many twists and turns, the Polish column ultimately arrived in insurgent-held Żoliborz (there are conflicting accounts regarding the exact course of these events). However, only 400 to 460 "forest" fighters reached there, as nearly 300 soldiers got lost in the darkness and returned to the Kampinos Forest.

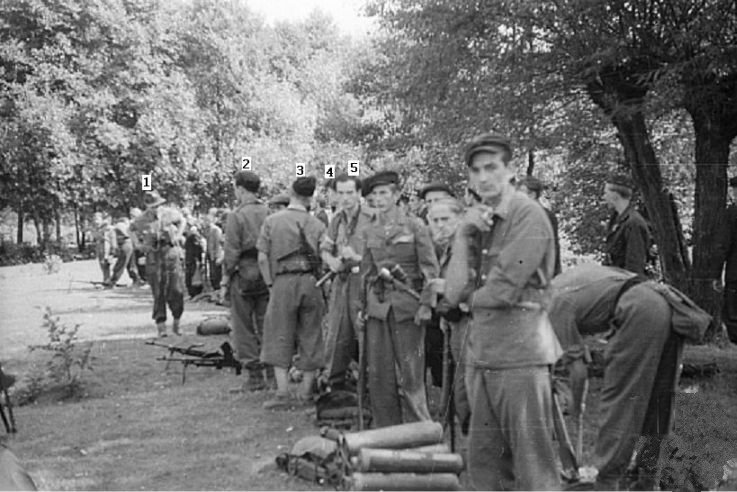
Soldiers of the aviation platoon of Lieutenant "Lawa" setting out to relieve Warsaw. Wiersze, 19 August 1944

That same night, Major "Okoń" reached the Kampinos Forest and immediately began organizing a second relief force for Warsaw. Within four days, he managed to organize a well-armed battalion comprising up to 780 soldiers. On the night of August 19/20, "Okoń", in accordance with the command's order, led his unit to Żoliborz. Along the way, they encountered posts manned by Hungarian troops allied with the Germans, but after brief negotiations, the Honvéds agreed to let the Poles pass without a fight. Crucial roles were played by the Kampinos Group soldiers Stefan Grzyb, alias "Adam", and Kazimierz Sołtysik, alias "Kazek", who had previously served as cross-border couriers for the Main Command of the Home Army and had been to Hungary several times, and in 1941 had led Lieutenant Józef Krzyczkowski across the green border to Poland. That night, however, maintaining order in the column proved once again unsuccessful, resulting in the loss of the aviation platoon under Lieutenant "Lawa" and at least part of the Sochaczew Company under Lieutenant "Mazur", who lost their way and had to return to the forest.

==== Attacks on Warszawa Gdańska railway station ====
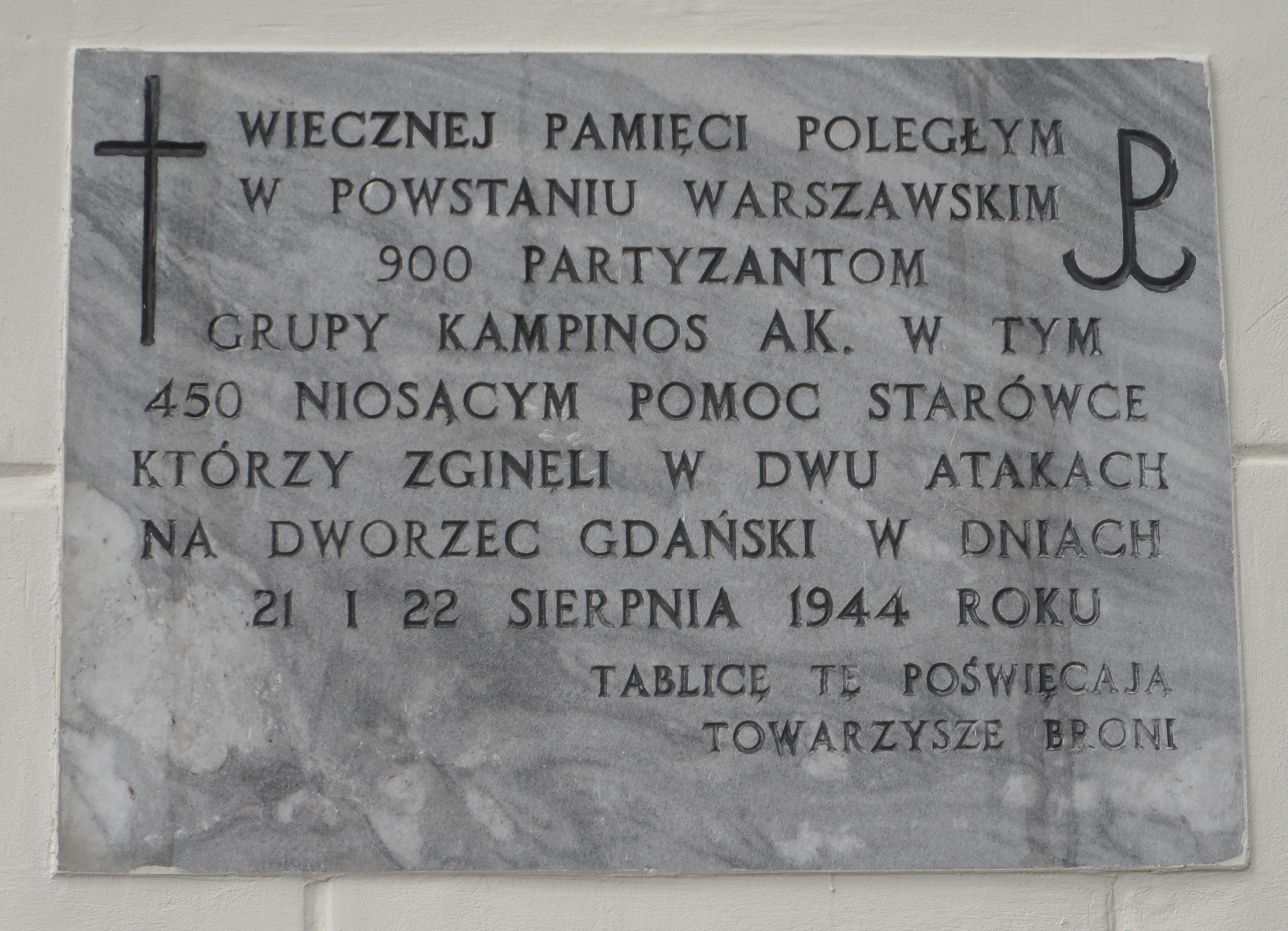
Plaque on the wall of St. Mary Magdalene Church in Warsaw's Wawrzyszew, commemorating soldiers of the Kampinos Group killed in the attacks on Warszawa Gdańska railway station

On August 20, there were already six companies from the Kampinos Group in Żoliborz, totaling between 750 to 940 well-armed soldiers. The insurgent command decided to use the "forest" fighters to break through the German barrier separating the Old Town from Żoliborz, with the Warszawa Gdańska railway station and nearby circular railway line forming its core. This task was extremely difficult due to numerous German defensive positions guarding the station and tracks, fortified with bunkers and barbed wire entanglements. Furthermore, the defenders were supported by an armored train, and the area in front of the tracks was flanked by German artillery and machine gun fire from nearby locations such as the Chemical Institute, Buraków, the Warsaw Citadel and Fort, and Romuald Traugutt Park. Polish units, on the other hand, lacked heavy weapons, and their command had a very vague idea of the enemy's strength and the layout of their positions. Moreover, the soldiers under "Okoń" were unfamiliar with the terrain of the upcoming battle and lacked experience in urban combat. However, the commander of the insurgent forces in Żoliborz, Lieutenant Colonel Mieczysław Niedzielski, alias "Żywiciel", did not agree to assign local guides to the "forest" fighters.

The first attack took place on the night of August 20/21, and there are conflicting accounts of its outcome. Most older sources state that after fierce fighting, the Polish assault collapsed under heavy enemy artillery and machine gun fire. The Kampinos units reportedly suffered heavy casualties, with over 100 killed and dozens wounded. A somewhat different picture of events emerges from the memoirs of Lieutenant Edward Bonarowski, alias "Ostromir", published in 2014. He claimed that the "forest" fighters incurred losses limited to several dozen killed and wounded that night, and the emerging opportunity to break through the German defenses was squandered due to mistakes made by Lieutenant Colonel "Żywiciel" and his staff.

The insurgent command decided to launch another attack the following night, this time with greater involvement of units from the Old Town and Żoliborz. General Tadeusz Pełczyński, alias "Grzegorz", the Chief of Staff of the Home Army, was to personally oversee the course of the offensive. However, several mistakes made during the initial assault were repeated – adequate reconnaissance of enemy positions was neglected, the "forest" fighters were not provided with local guides, and the soldiers were excessively burdened with additional supplies of weapons and ammunition. Moreover, after the experiences of the previous night, German soldiers remained vigilant, remaining at their positions ready for combat. As a result, shortly after the start of the attack, Polish units came under heavy enemy artillery and machine gun fire. The appearance of a German armored train on the tracks was particularly decisive for the course of the battle. Ultimately, only small groups of insurgents managed to break through to the other side of the tracks, where most of them were subsequently wiped out. As a result of the several-hour-long battle, the six Kampinos companies suffered huge losses, in some cases amounting to two-thirds of their personnel. The exact extent of Polish casualties is unknown. It is estimated that on the outskirts of the circular railway, between 350 to over 500 "forest" fighters were killed that night. Many officers were among the dead. Meanwhile, the assault by the Old Town units, due to poor coordination of actions, began with significant delay compared to the attack of the Kampinos-Żoliborz forces and was repulsed with significant losses.

==== Kampinos soldiers in insurgent Warsaw ====
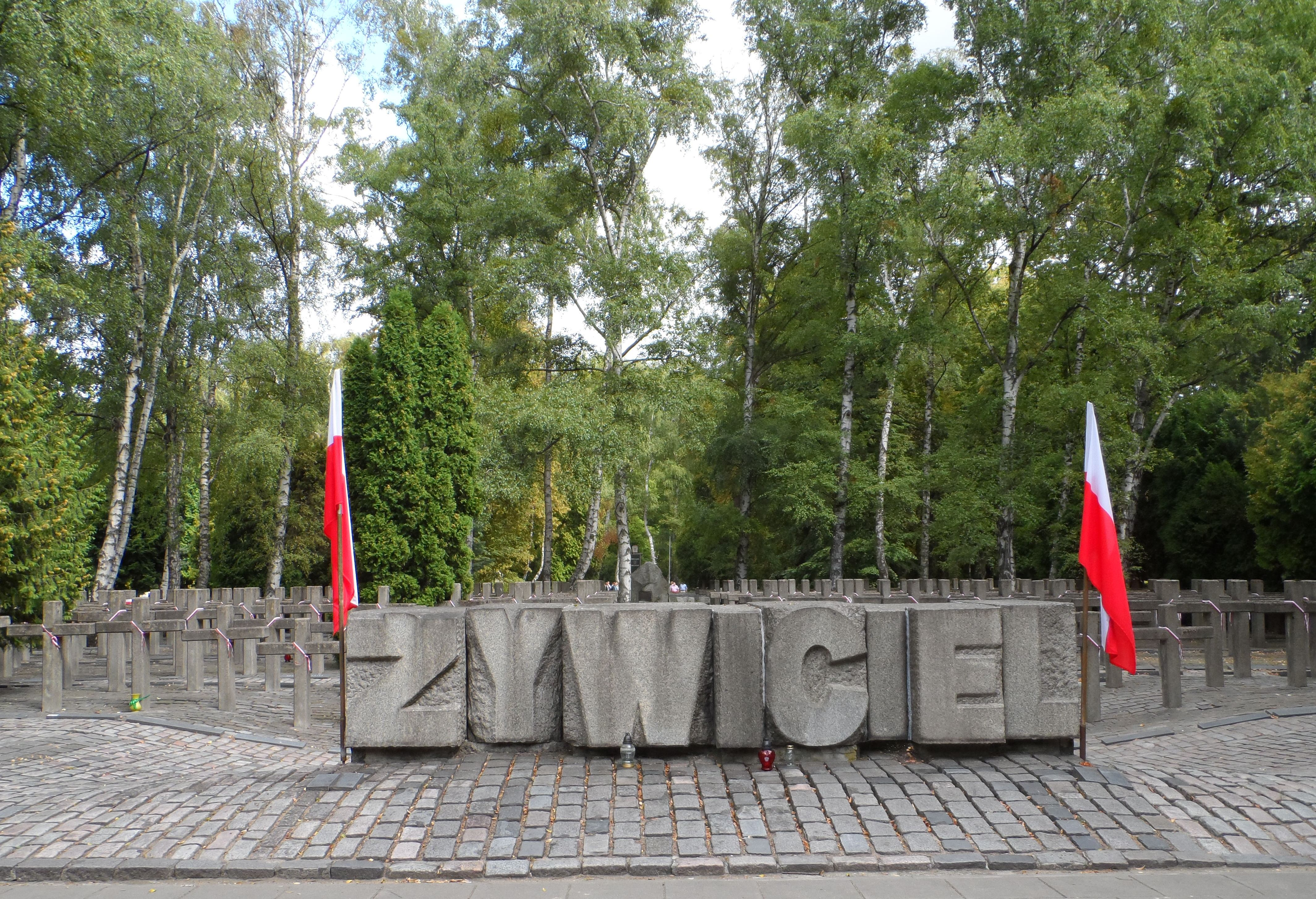
"Żywiciel" quarter at the Powązki Military Cemetery. In addition to soldiers of Żoliborz Subdistrict, soldiers of the Kampinos Group who died during the attacks on Warszawa Gdańska railway station and in the defense of Żoliborz are buried there

After the defeat at Warszawa Gdańska railway station, General "Grzegorz" ordered Major "Okoń" to lead the remaining troops back to the Kampinos Forest. Before departing, the "forest" fighters had to surrender all their weapons and ammunition. (Note: The soldiers of the forest units, exhausted from the two-day battle and saddened by the loss of many comrades, received this order with great bitterness. The particularly brutal enforcement of the order by "Okoń" sparked outrage among the ranks. Witnesses to these events claimed that the major, known for his impulsive character and vulgarity, practically tore weapons from some soldiers' hands, sparing no curses or insults in the process. From the very beginning, the "forest" soldiers treated "Okoń" with distrust and, albeit unjustly, held him primarily responsible for the defeat at Gdańsk Railway Station. After disarming the remnants, the major stirred up hatred among many subordinates (Bonarowski (2014, p. 123); Krzyczkowski (1962, p. 310); Pilch (2013, p. 221)).) On the evening of August 23, a detachment of nearly 300 soldiers left Żoliborz under Major "Okoń's" command, consisting of around 120 to 150 disarmed soldiers from the Kampinos Group and a large group of insurgents from various Warsaw units. Additionally, a number of civilian authorities from the insurgent government and two members of the Main Command of the Peasant Battalions, along with a group of printers and liaisons, also headed for the forest.

Lieutenant "Witold" chose to remain in Żoliborz, accompanied by over 150 "forest" fighters, mostly former soldiers of the Stowbtsy-Naliboki Group. Around 40 soldiers from the Marymont platoon 225, previously under Lieutenant "Dan's" command, also decided not to return to the forest. The Kampinos soldiers were divided into three platoons: platoon 207 under the command of Lieutenant Henryk Czerwiec, alias "Jaskólski", platoon 208 under the command of Second Lieutenant Edward Bonarowski, alias "Ostromir", and platoon 209 under the command of Second Lieutenant Józef Krzywicki, alias "Prawdzic". (Note: In some sources, information can be found that from the remnants of the forest companies, four platoons were formed. Grzegorz Jasiński stated that the commander of the fourth platoon was Lieutenant Marian Sitek, alias "Janusz". On the other hand, Edward Bonarowski claimed that the fourth platoon, also included in the Żaba Group, was commanded by Second Lieutenant Tadeusz Dudziński, alias "Zawieja". After the dissolution of the Żaba Group, this platoon was incorporated into the Żyrafa Group (Jasiński (2009, p. 257); Bonarowski (2014, pp. 138–139, 143)).) These three platoons formed the Żaba Group, with Lieutenant "Witold" assuming command. The task of the newly formed group was to defend the southern section of Żoliborz, including the school building, a key bastion of insurgent defense. The remnants of platoon 225 were reintegrated into the parent Żmija Group. However, on August 26, the command of insurgent Żoliborz decided to disband the Żaba Group. Platoons 207 and 208 were absorbed into the Żaglowiec Group and remained in their positions, while platoon 209 was deployed to Promyk Street in Dolny Żoliborz, becoming part of the Żbik Group. Lieutenant "Witold" joined the staff of Lieutenant Colonel "Żywiciel". The platoons formed from the former Kampinos companies fought in the defense of Żoliborz until the district's surrender on September 30.

Approximately 30 soldiers from the Kampinos Group, led by Second Lieutenant Jerzy Rybka, alias "Kiejster", remained in Warsaw. They crossed the canals to the Old Town, where they joined the 2nd company of the Parasol Battalion, participating in the entire combat route of the Radosław Group.

=== "Independent Republic of Kampinos" ===
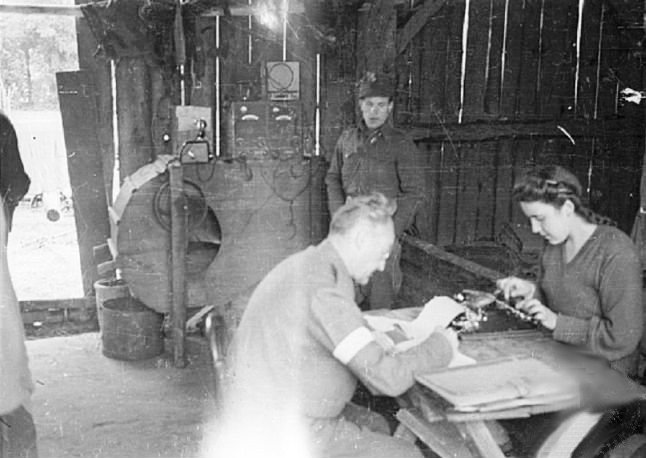
Chancellery of the command of the Kampinos Group in Wiersze

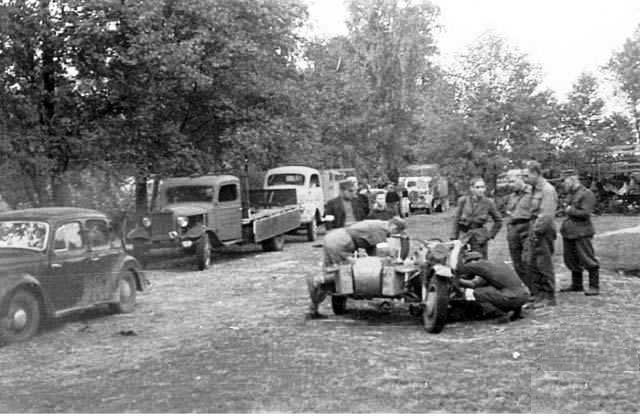
Trophy car park

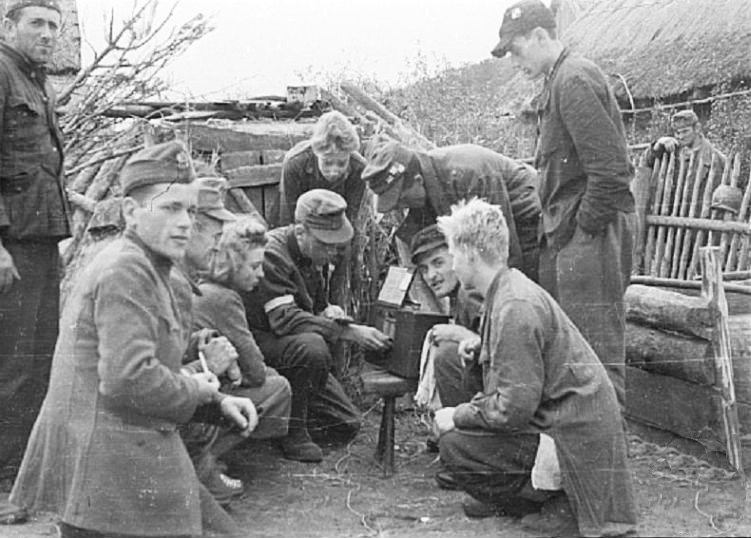
Soldiers of the aviation company listening to the broadcast of the Błyskawica radio station

At the end of August 1944, the Kampinos Group already had undisputed control over the eastern and central areas of the Kampinos Forest, inhabited by several thousand people. Villages such as Ławy, Łubiec, Roztoka, Kiścinne, Krogulec, Wędziszew, Brzozówka, Truskawka, Janówek, Pociecha, Zaborów Leśny, and Wiersze were liberated from German occupation. Polish patrols were also able to penetrate numerous neighboring villages previously unoccupied by enemy forces. The area liberated by the Home Army soldiers was called the "Independent Republic of Kampinos". Its unofficial capital was Wiersze, where the headquarters of the Kampinos Group were located.

After over a thousand soldiers crossed to Żoliborz, there were only about 500 armed partisans left in the forest, including the entire cavalry. An energetic enemy attack at that time could have led to the complete destruction of the "Independent Republic of Kampinos". Fortunately for the Polish side, the Germans limited themselves to cautious aggressive actions in the Brzozówka and Janówek area on August 22. Probably the decisive factor for the temporary passivity of the enemy was that German intelligence significantly overestimated the size of the Polish group. In the second half of August, the command of the German 9th Army estimated that there were about 5,000 soldiers fighting in the ranks of the Kampinos Group. Some informants even reported that there were 15,000 partisans in the Kampinos Forest equipped with artillery and anti-aircraft defense. Probably, the energetic actions of the Polish cavalry, making numerous raids in distant locations, reinforced the Germans' belief in the large size of the Kampinos Group.

On August 24, Major "Okoń" returned to Wiersze. He brought with him an order signed by General Pełczyński, confirming that all Home Army units in the Kampinos Forest now fell under the jurisdiction of the major. In the same order, the chief of staff of the Home Army appointed new tasks for the Kampinos Group. They were primarily passive in nature and did not involve conducting significant sabotage actions behind the German lines fighting in Warsaw. According to General Pełczyński's order, the main task of the forest units was to receive airdrops made by Allied aircraft and organize regular deliveries of weapons, ammunition, food, and equipment to the besieged capital. The Kampinos Group was also instructed to cooperate with Home Army units fighting in Warsaw to eliminate German units in the northwestern part of the city.

The German command was aware that the Poles were attempting to organize a supply and recruitment base for the Warsaw Uprising in the Kampinos Forest. Initially, the task of blocking communication between the forest and the city was entrusted to the Hungarian 12th Reserve Division of the 2nd Reserve Corps. Soon, however, the Germans realized that the barrier created by their allies remained largely fictional, as the Honvéds openly sympathized with the Poles. Although the Hungarian command rejected the Polish proposal for a change of alliance, both sides entered into an informal "non-aggression pact". As a result, the Hungarians did not interfere with maintaining communication between the forest units and Żoliborz – even allowing multiple marches of compact and well-armed Home Army units near their outposts. In this situation, at the end of August, the Germans withdrew the Hungarians from the vicinity of Warsaw, simultaneously strengthening the barrier around the city. On August 27, the areas near Truskaw and Sieraków were occupied by units of the collaborationist Kaminski Brigade, numbering nearly 1500 soldiers (Russians and Belarusians). Kaminski Brigade quickly formed a solid barrier stretching through Laski, Izabelin, and Borzęcin Duży towards Leszno. Similar to the Ochota Massacre in Warsaw, Kaminski Brigade soldiers brutally terrorized the Polish civilian population. For the inhabitants of the Kampinos villages, robberies and rapes of women became a daily occurrence. Additionally, on August 28, Kaminski Brigade units began attacking the Polish outpost in Pociecha.

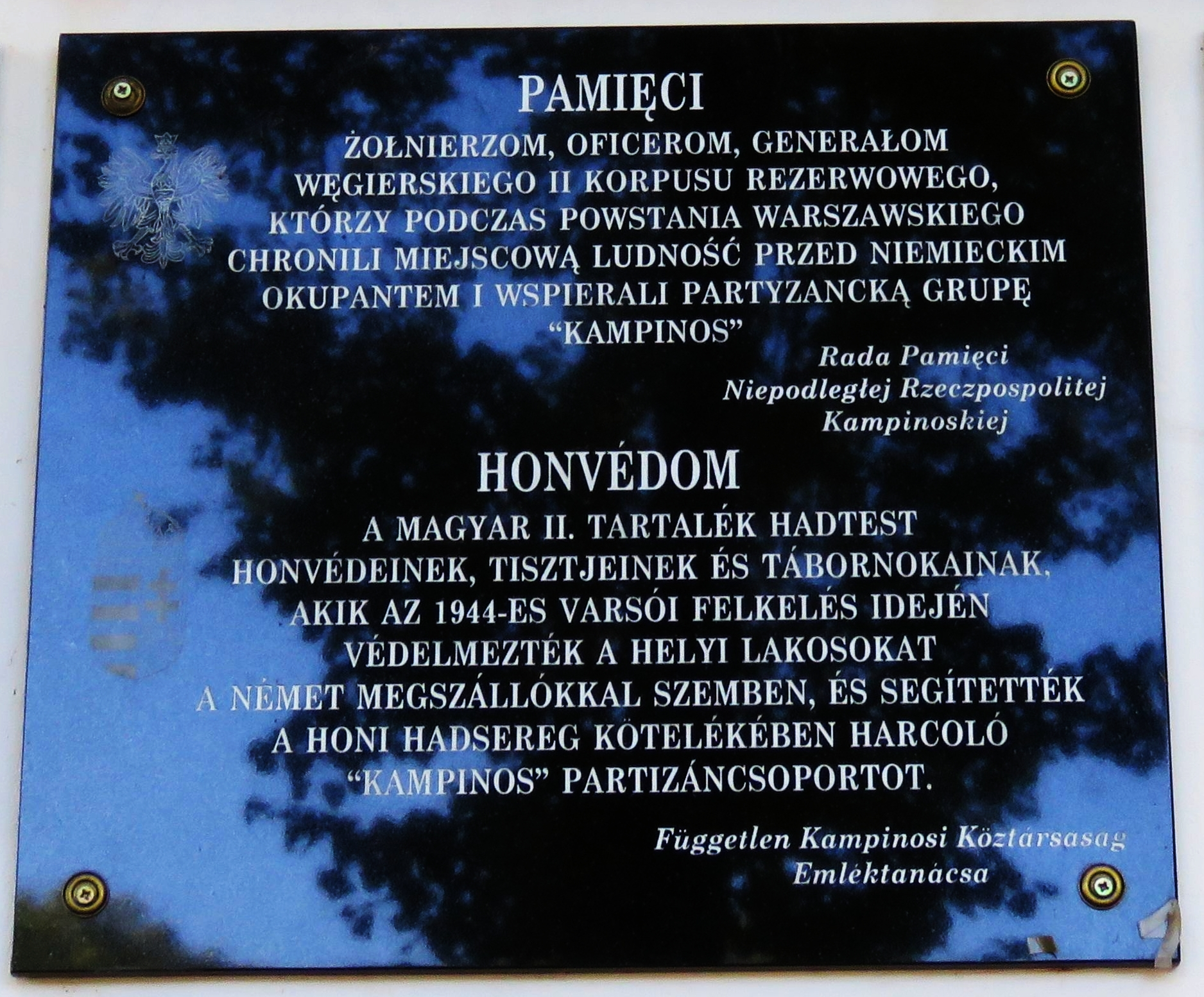
Plaque on the wall of the church in Wiersze, commemorating the benevolent attitude of Hungarian soldiers towards insurgents and civilians

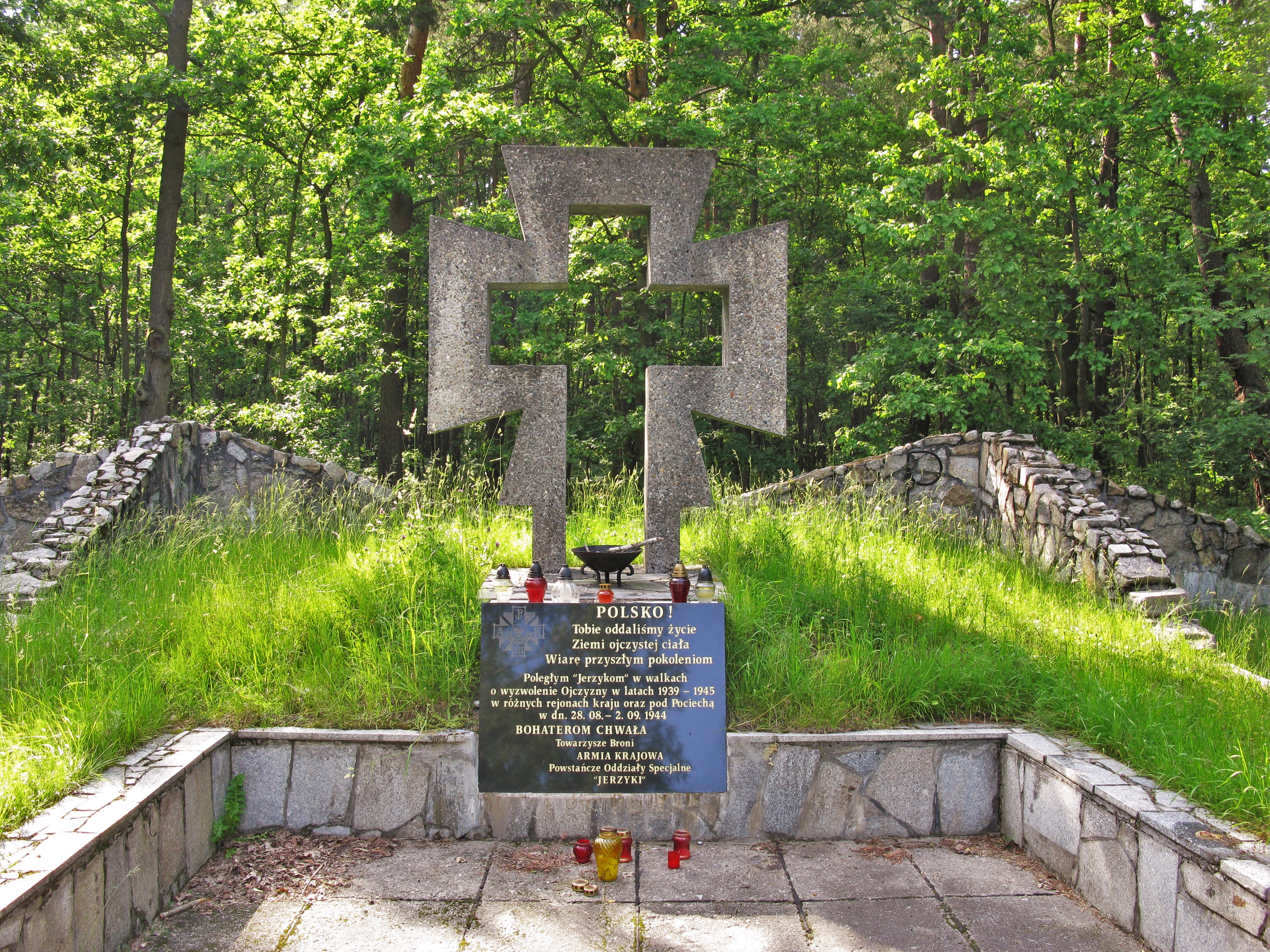
Monument in memory of soldiers from the Jerzyki Company of Special Combat Units killed in battles in the Pociecha area

At that time, defensive positions in the Pociecha area were held by infantry from the Jerzyki Company supported by the 3rd squadron of the 27th Uhlan Regiment. (Note: In a later phase of the fighting, both subunits were relieved by infantrymen from Major "Korwin's" Sochaczew battalion and lancers from the 2nd squadron of the 27th Uhlan Regiment (Podgóreczny (2010, pp. 129–130)).) Supported by artillery fire and heavy infantry weapons, the Kaminski Brigade troops attempted for six days to break through the Polish defense – but each time, they were unsuccessful. Jerzy Krzyczkowski estimated that 16 Polish soldiers were killed and 23 wounded in the defense of the village, while the Kaminski Brigade was said to have suffered losses of at least 30 killed and 40 wounded. Jerzy Koszada, however, assessed that Polish losses in the fighting near Pociecha amounted to 21 killed and 35 wounded, while the enemy losses were estimated at 51 killed and 40 wounded. According to Marian Podgóreczny's assessment, the trench warfare in the Pociecha area constituted the longest partisan battle fought on Polish soil during the German occupation.

At the same time, in other areas, the Germans and their collaborators also attempted to penetrate deep into the forest. On August 28, Polish soldiers attempted to break up a German unit conducting cattle requisitions in Małocice. What initially started as a small skirmish soon escalated into a fierce battle, involving, on the Polish side, a flight platoon led by Lieutenant "Lawa" and a cavalry reconnaissance squadron, and on the German side, an infantry battalion supported by armored vehicles, artillery, and aircraft. Under pressure from the enemy, Polish soldiers had to retreat, suffering several killed and wounded. The next day, near the village of Kiścinne, Polish cavalry routed a German unit the size of a company that had penetrated the forest from the direction of Leszno. With minimal losses on their side, approximately 140 Germans were killed, and another ten were taken prisoner. On September 1, the enemy displaced a Polish outpost from Roztoka, but soon, Home Army soldiers swiftly recaptured the village with a violent counterattack. The Germans lost 23 killed and three prisoners, while the insurgents' losses were limited to two wounded.

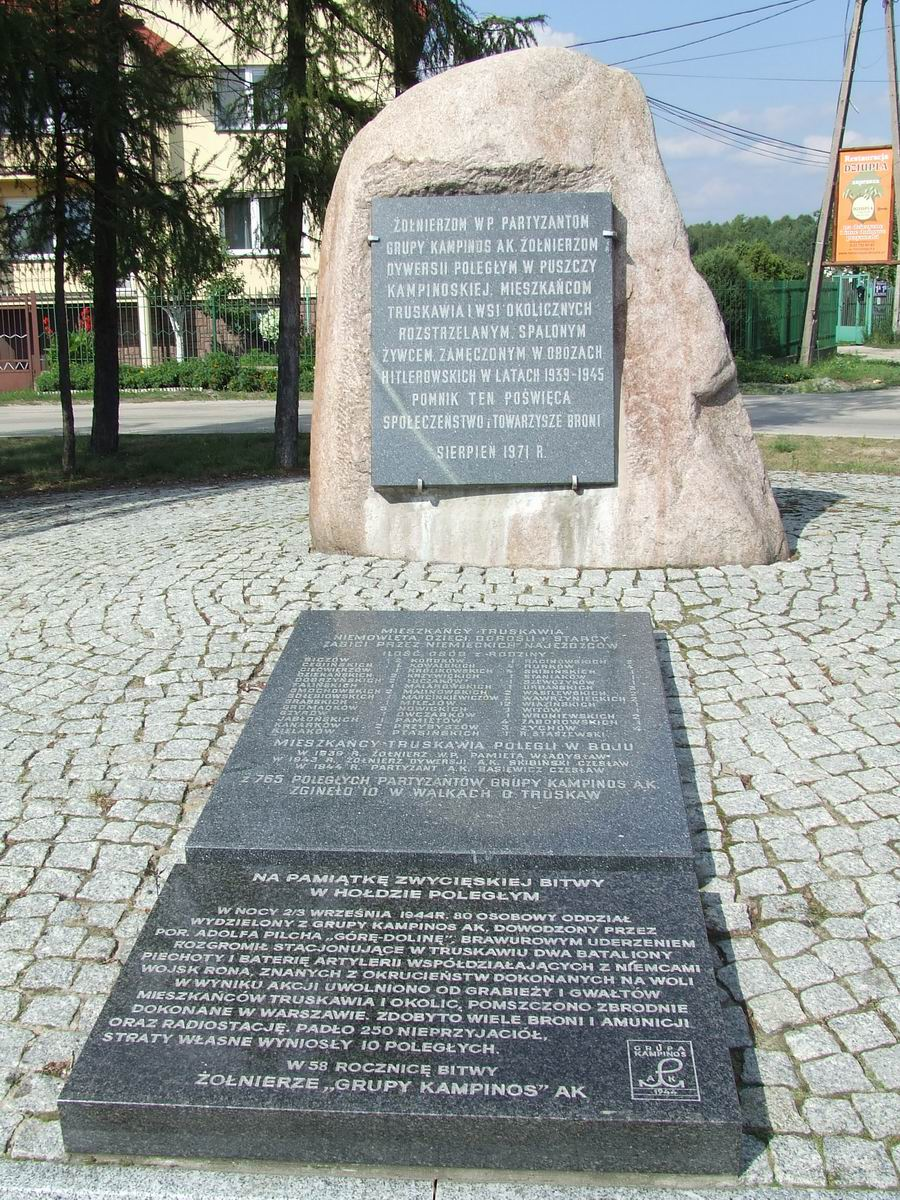
Monument in Truskaw, commemorating, among other things, the victorious outing of the "Dolina" unit on the night of 2/3 September 1944

The Polish command decided not to wait passively for further enemy strikes. During the night of September 2/3, an 80-strong assault unit led by Lieutenant "Dolina" carried out a surprise raid on the Kaminski Brigade troops quartered in Truskaw. With minimal losses on their side, the Poles completely routed two strong enemy units, capturing large quantities of weapons and ammunition (including a 75mm caliber cannon). Between 91 and 250 Kaminski Brigade troops were killed, and several to a dozen artillery pieces as well as nearly 30 ammunition wagons were destroyed. That same night, Major "Okoń" led a similar raid on the neighboring Sieraków, but the Polish strike missed its target as the enemy had abandoned the village the previous day. During the night of September 3/4, another raid was conducted, this time targeting two Kaminski Brigade companies quartered in the village of Marianów near Leszno. In a battle lasting less than half an hour, an 80-strong cavalry unit commanded by Captain "Nieczaj" and Second Lieutenant "Dąbrowa" completely crushed the enemy outpost, killing between 60 and 100 Kaminski Brigade troops. During the raid, a quantity of weapons was also captured, and between 22 and 24 prisoners were taken (they were executed when items and valuables looted in Warsaw were found in their possession). As a result of these defeats, Kaminski Brigade units withdrew on September 4 to the line of Laski–Izabelin–Hornówek–Lipków. The Kaminski Brigade troops did not dare to launch further offensive actions against the Kampinos Group, limiting themselves to terrorizing the residents of nearby villages. On September 15, the remnants of Kaminski Brigade were withdrawn from the Warsaw area.

Despite the victories achieved against the Kaminski Brigade, the Polish group remained permanently cut off from the insurgent Warsaw. During this time, the Home Army High Command also lost interest in the Kampinos Forest, acknowledging that no relief or significant supply deliveries could be expected from there anymore. The actions of the Kampinos Group were henceforth treated by the Polish command as part of the activities of the insurgent Żoliborz district. On September 2, the Home Army Chief Commander, General Tadeusz Komorowski, alias "Bór", appealed to the Polish authorities in London to cease the airdrops by Allied aircraft over the Kampinos Forest.

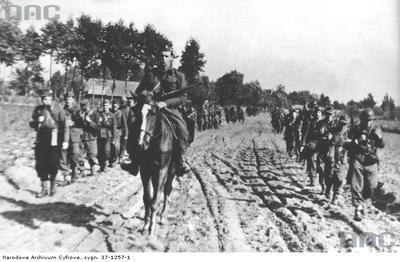
Aviation company soldiers photographed while marching out on an outing

In September, the Kampinos Group continued to organize ambushes and raids against enemy outposts and their communication lines. Upon learning of German plans to build bridges over the Vistula near Wyszogród, Lieutenant "Dolina" led an attack on a sawmill in Piaski Królewskie during the night of September 6/7. Three cavalry squadrons, supported by Lieutenant "Lawa's" aviation platoon, burned down the facility along with the accumulated building materials, killing over 30 Germans and capturing a considerable amount of weapons and ammunition. The Polish losses were limited to a few killed and a few wounded.

To supplement food supplies, raids were also conducted on estates under German administration (Liegenschaft). Particularly successful was the attack on a German transport unit bivouacked at the manor in Pilaszków, during which Polish lancers captured 254 head of cattle and several wagons loaded with food, cigarettes, and cognac (September 8). Another success was achieved two days later in a raid on the estate in Zaborów, from which several dozen cows, 16 horses, and 8 wagons were taken. Additionally, the partisans set up ambushes on the Babice–Leszno road for small enemy units or lone traveling cars and motorcycles. Often, deception was used, exploiting captured motorcycles and dressing soldiers in German uniforms. On September 20, the Germans were driven out of Polesie Nowe, but the Legion Battalion paid for this success with relatively heavy losses.

In September, the Kampinos Group also engaged in several defensive battles. On September 14, soldiers of the Palmiry-Młociny Regiment repelled a German punitive expedition intending to pacify Buda and Mariew. Meanwhile, in mid-September, the Germans, supported by armored cars, attempted to dislodge Home Army soldiers from Pociecha. Covered by minefields, soldiers of the Sochaczew Battalion managed to repel all attacks. The Germans lost several killed and one armored car in the vicinity of Pociecha.

==== Allied airdrops over the Kampinos Forest ====
During the Warsaw Uprising, Allied aircraft, including planes piloted by Polish pilots from the No. 301 Polish Bomber Squadron, conducted airdrops of containers with weapons, ammunition, and other supplies over the Kampinos Forest. The overall direction of the airdrop operation was managed by Second Lieutenants Józef Regulski, alias "Biały", and Jan Dąbrowski, alias "Jan". Responsible for collecting the containers and securing the drop zones was a roughly 50-person "airdrop platoon" detached from the Palmiry-Młociny Regiment, led by Second Lieutenant Józef Karney, alias "Drewno". Jerzy Koszada reported that there were four drop zones within the "Independent Republic of Kampinos":

- "Chochla" – in meadows near the Debły sanctuary and the village of Ławy. The station commander was Second Lieutenant Henryk Rogala, alias "Mały";
- "Wiersze" – in the vicinity of the villages of Dąbrowa, Krogulec, and Wiersze. The station commander was Second Lieutenant NN "Konrad" from the company of Second Lieutenant Franciszek Wiszniowski, alias "Jurek";
- "Truskawka" – in the vicinity of the Truskawka village. The station was serviced by the aforementioned "airdrop platoon";
- "Igła" – between Sieraków and Truskawka. This station was also serviced by the "airdrop platoon".

Already on the night of August 4/5, the "Chochla" station, still under the command of the Błonie District, received an Allied airdrop of weapons and equipment. The contents of the containers were later transferred to the Kampinos units. The first airdrop directly intended for the "Szymon" and "Dolina" units was made on the night of August 9/10. Jerzy Koszada reported that in August and September 1944, the Kampinos units received a total of 22 airdrops. Of these, 18 were supposed to be received by designated stations, and two were found in the Kampinos Forest but outside the designated stations (near Kromnów and Zamczysko). The last two airdrops were supposed to be received by the "Tasak" station operating near Mińsk Mazowiecki and then secretly transported to the Kampinos Forest. Jerzy Kirchmayer reported that the containers received by the Kampinos units contained approximately: 3 mortars with 75 shells, 50 light machine guns with 400,000 rounds of ammunition, 200 submachine guns with 200,000 rounds of ammunition, 30 PIATs with 450 rounds, 30 rifles with 100,000 rounds of ammunition, 250 revolvers and pistols with 7,000 rounds of ammunition, 2,300 hand grenades, 1,000 anti-tank grenades, and 3,000 dressings.

Some of the weapons and supplies obtained from the airdrops were allocated to the units of the Kampinos Group. The rest were delivered to Warsaw by two relief flights and special transport units.

=== Breaking of the Kampinos Group near Jaktorów ===
In mid-September, it became clear that the "Kampinos" Group would soon have to leave the Kampinos Forest. The Warsaw Uprising was inevitably heading towards collapse, and it was to be expected that after the end of the fighting in the capital, the Germans would commence "cleansing" of the forest. In the context of approaching autumn cold, it was also significant that the villages in Kampinos were unable to provide the numerous partisan group with a sufficient amount of food, clothing, and dry shelter. The Home Army High Command expected that the Kampinos group would break through to the insurgent Żoliborz and join the units of Lieutenant Colonel "Żywiciel". On the other hand, the Command of the Western Subdistrict of the Home Army "Hajduki" proposed to Major "Okoń" the dissolution of the group, offering at the same time assistance in the deployment of soldiers and their care. However, the commander of the Kampinos Group intended to break through with his soldiers to the Świętokrzyskie Mountains to continue the fight against the occupier there, together with local units of the Home Army.

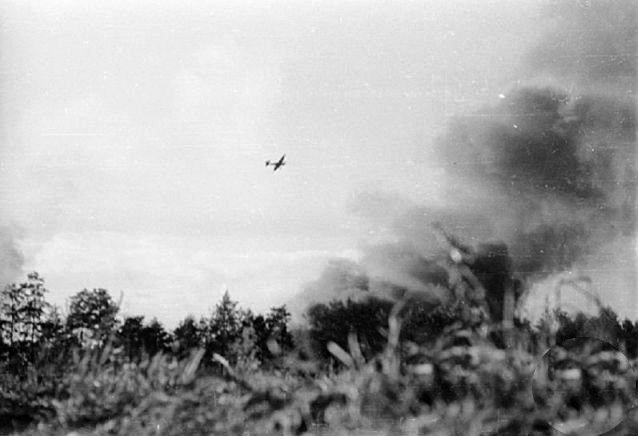
The first day of Operation Sternschnuppe. German air raid on the headquarters of the Kampinos Group command in Wiersze

With the cessation of the Soviet Union's offensive on the Warsaw front and the waning of the uprising, the German command concluded that the time was ripe to liquidate the Kampinos Group. In the anti-partisan operation, codenamed Sternschnuppe (Falling Star"), a combined tactical group under the command of General Friedrich Bernhard took part, equipped with artillery, armored vehicles, and air support. Tadeusz Sawicki assessed that the total strength assigned to crush the Kampinos Group exceeded, in terms of numbers and armament, the structure of a regular infantry division. The beginning of Operation Sternschnuppe took place on September 27, when the Germans struck at Polish positions in the eastern and south-eastern parts of the Kampinos Forest. Fierce battles took place in the area of Brzozówka, Janówek, Pociecha, and Zaborów Leśny. On that day, German Air Force also carried out a raid on the headquarters of the Kampinos Group in Wiersze.

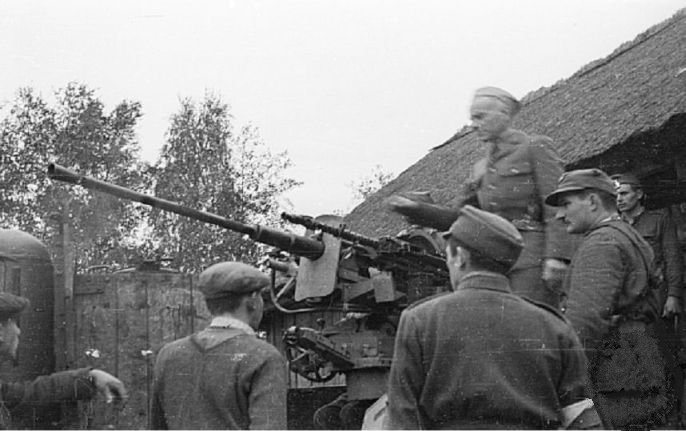
Major "Okoń" speaking to soldiers before marching out of the Kampinos Forest

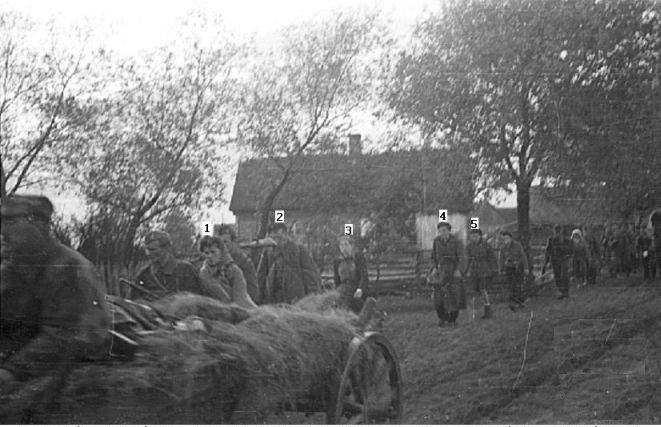
Soldiers of the aviation company of Leutienant "Lawa" during the retreat from the forest

The German attacks were relatively cautious and did not lead to any significant breakthroughs in the Polish defense on any front. Nevertheless, Major "Okoń" quickly realized that they were merely a prelude to a large-scale operation aimed at breaking up the Kampinos Group. Already after the first German air raid, he withdrew the main forces of the group to the forests south of Wiersze, Brzozówka, and Truskawka. He then ordered a full retreat of the entire group to the western part of the Kampinos Forest, from where he intended to break through to the forests south of Żyrardów. Assessing that their units would not withstand the hardships of the march and the impending battles, "Okoń" ordered the soldiers to disperse to their homes. According to earlier orders from the subdistrict headquarters "Hajduki", the Sochaczew Battalion under Major "Korwin" was demobilized. The detachment under Second Lieutenant "Teoch" was also dissolved. The remaining units, after a difficult and poorly organized night march, reached the vicinity of the village of Bieliny on the morning of September 28, where "Okoń" ordered a full day of rest. Thanks to reports from agents and information provided by captured civilians, the Germans became aware that the Poles had begun to retreat, but they failed to determine the direction of the march and the location of the Polish group's stop.

In the afternoon of September 28, the Kampinos Group resumed its retreat. The experiences from the previous night indicated that the extensive baggage trains significantly hindered and slowed down the march of the Polish column. However, Major "Okoń" harshly rejected all suggestions from his officers regarding leaving behind the wounded and reducing the number of baggage wagons. (Note: The course of these events was somewhat differently presented by Major "Okoń's" adjutant, Corporal Lucjan Wiśniewski, alias "Sęp", who claimed that it was Lieutenant "Dolina" who protested most energetically against abandoning the baggage wagons, arguing that he had brought them all the way from the Naliboki Forest, and the equipment on the wagons could be useful during subsequent operations (Bielecki & Kulesza (1996, p. 447)).) As a result, the march proceeded very slowly, and in the dark of night and on unfamiliar terrain, it was extremely difficult to maintain the cohesion of the column. However, the Germans still did not know the location of the Kampinos Group, so the first phase of the retreat proceeded without major incidents. Shortly before midnight on September 29, Polish soldiers reached the vicinity of Wiejca, where they broke through without major difficulties the barrier set up by the collaborationist 308th Russian Battalion, connecting Leszno with Kampinos. Shortly thereafter, "Okoń" decided to leave some of the wounded in Gawartowa Wola and Łuszczewko. However, the prolonged halt and the still too slow pace of the march resulted in German armored vehicles sent in pursuit intercepting the rear guard of the Kampinos Group during the crossing of a small wooden bridge over the Utrata river. Chaos erupted in the Polish wagons, and only due to the determined stance of the infantry from the Jerzyki Company and the lancers from the 3rd squadron of the rear guard, the retreat was able to be completed to the other side of the Utrata. However, in the night battle, up to 53 soldiers were lost, as well as the only 75mm cannon, over 150 horses, and 91 baggage wagons with a large amount of supplies. The injured commander of the Jerzyki Company, Second Lieutenant Jerzy Strzałkowski, alias "Jerzy", fell into captivity. Another clash between the Polish rear guard and the German pursuit occurred on the morning of September 29 near the village of Baranów. The units led by Second Lieutenant "Dolina" managed to break away from the enemy, but some baggage trains and a certain number of marauders fell into the hands of the Germans. Due to the losses suffered in previous battles, as well as the fact that individual soldiers and small subunits were constantly detaching from the main column, the Kampinos Group had dwindled by this time to about 1,200 soldiers.

Meanwhile, even before the battle began near Baranów, the main forces of the Polish group reached the area of the village of Budy Zosine near Jaktorów, by the railway tracks of the Warsaw–Żyrardów line. At this moment, "Okoń" unexpectedly ordered a several-hour halt in the march. The major probably intended to use the stop for rest and to organize the column, and to enable marauders and the rear guard to catch up with the rest of the group. However, many officers received this decision with great concern, as it was known that an enemy pursuit was already following the Kampinos Group, and the vast meadows where the Polish units stood were very difficult terrain to defend, favoring the Germans with their firepower advantage. Budy Zosine was only 6 km away from the Radziejowice Forest on the other side of the tracks, so the officers were convinced that the soldiers would be able to make one final effort and jump across the tracks. However, "Okoń" stubbornly stuck to the decision, angrily rejecting all the advice of his subordinates. He didn't even arrange for the securing of passage across the embankment and the blowing up of the railway tracks. Meanwhile, German units gathered hastily in the Żyrardów area.

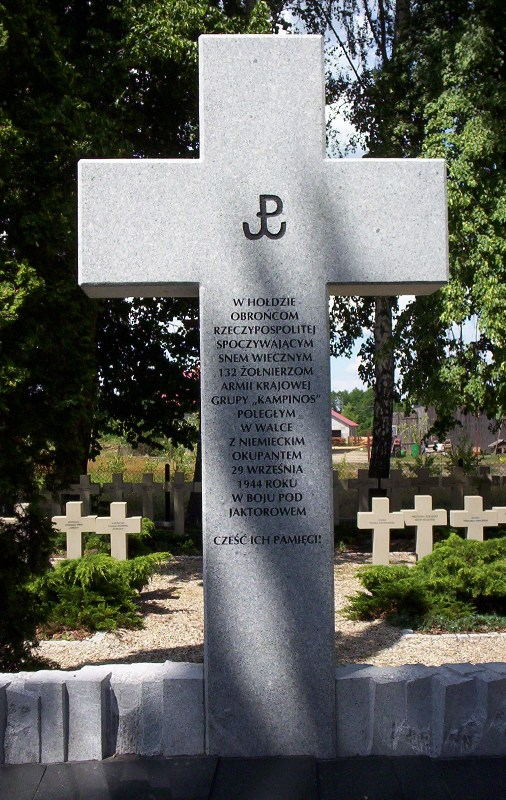
Monument at the war cemetery in Budy Zosine

Only around noon did the infantry battalion under the command of Lieutenant Witold Lenczewski, alias "Strzała", begin to attack the German positions at the railway tracks. Home Army soldiers, covered by machine gun fire, managed to push the German infantry to the other side of the embankment. Some small groups of soldiers even managed to break through the tracks. At this moment, when victory seemed close, a turning point occurred. From the direction of Żyrardów, a German train carrying several Panzer IV tanks and armored personnel carriers on open flatcars entered the tracks. The advancing "Strzała" battalion was quickly pinned to the ground and decimated by the intense fire of cannons and machine guns. Then, the train crew shifted their fire onto the wagons, causing massive losses among the vehicles and horses. After the unsuccessful attempt to cross the tracks, the units of the Kampinos Group took up defensive positions in the shape of an extensive quadrangle. The encirclement ring was not yet closed, so there was still a chance, with energetic command and at the cost of abandoning the wagons, that the Polish group could avoid destruction. However, Major "Okoń" remained passive, presumably intending to hold the defended positions until dusk, and then attempt a breakout towards the northwest of Żyrardów.

Taking advantage of the passivity of the Polish command, the Germans closed the encirclement ring around the Kampinos Group and then attacked Polish positions from several directions. Home Army units crowded in an area of less than 6 km^{2} were bombarded with fire from German artillery, causing massive losses among men and horses. German tanks systematically destroyed successive Polish positions, gradually breaking the cohesive defense line into isolated pockets of resistance. Enemy aircraft also appeared over the battlefield. For several hours, Polish soldiers successfully repelled German attacks. It was only in the afternoon, when Major "Okoń" was killed in mysterious circumstances after an unsuccessful attempt to break the encirclement, (Note: It was suspected that "Okoń", overwhelmed by the course of events, committed suicide or was shot by one of his subordinates, blaming him for the defeat of the group. Towards the latter version leaned Szymon Nowak, pointing out, among other things, a kind of "conspiracy of silence" surrounding the circumstances of the major's death, as observed by chroniclers and veterans of the Kampinos Group (Nowak (2011, pp. 201–204)).) that the Kampinos Group ceased to function as an organized combat formation. Throughout the late afternoon and evening, individual units continued to fight, trying to hold out until dusk and then break out of the cauldron. Lieutenant "Dolina" managed to break through to the nearby Mariańska Forest with over 50 improvised troops. Shortly thereafter, three squadrons of lancers launched a violent charge towards the village of Grądy. At the cost of heavy losses, approximately 140–200 cavalrymen broke through the encirclement ring. Several other small Home Army units also managed to escape from the cauldron near Jaktorów.

The Battle of Jaktorów was probably the largest partisan battle fought during World War II on Polish land west of the Vistula river, and it also marked the final battle of the Kampinos Group. The Polish formation was defeated, losing probably around 150–200 killed, about 120 wounded, and 150 taken prisoner. Most of the horses, almost all heavy weapons, wagons, and supplies of equipment and ammunition were also lost. German losses probably amounted to around 100–150 killed and wounded. Polish soldiers also managed to shoot down an Focke-Wulf Fw 189 Uhu reconnaissance aircraft and destroy or damage several German armored vehicles.

==== Epilogue ====
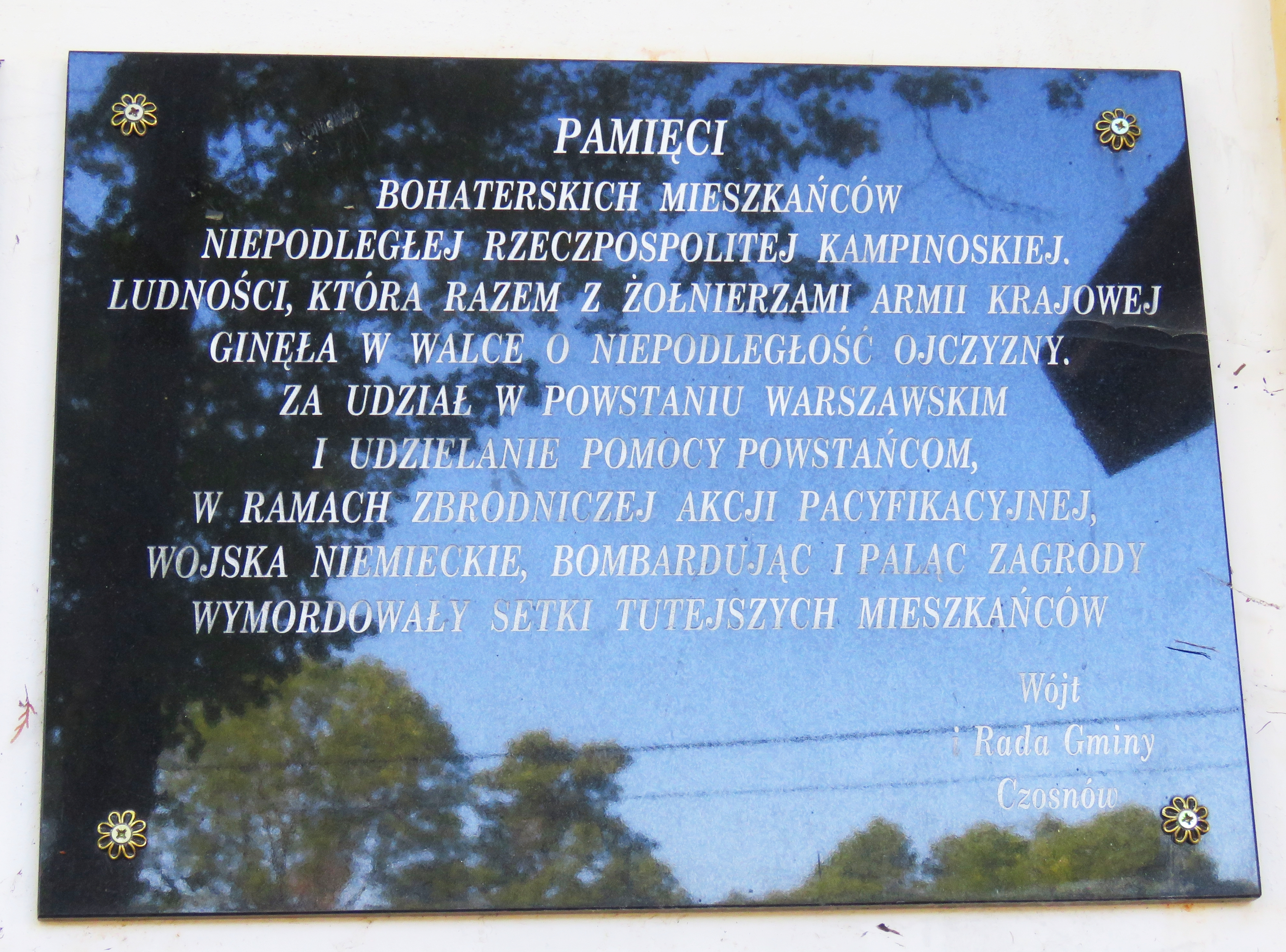
Plaque on the wall of the church in Wiersze commemorating the civilian population and the sacrifices they made after the fall of the "Independent Republic of Kampinos"

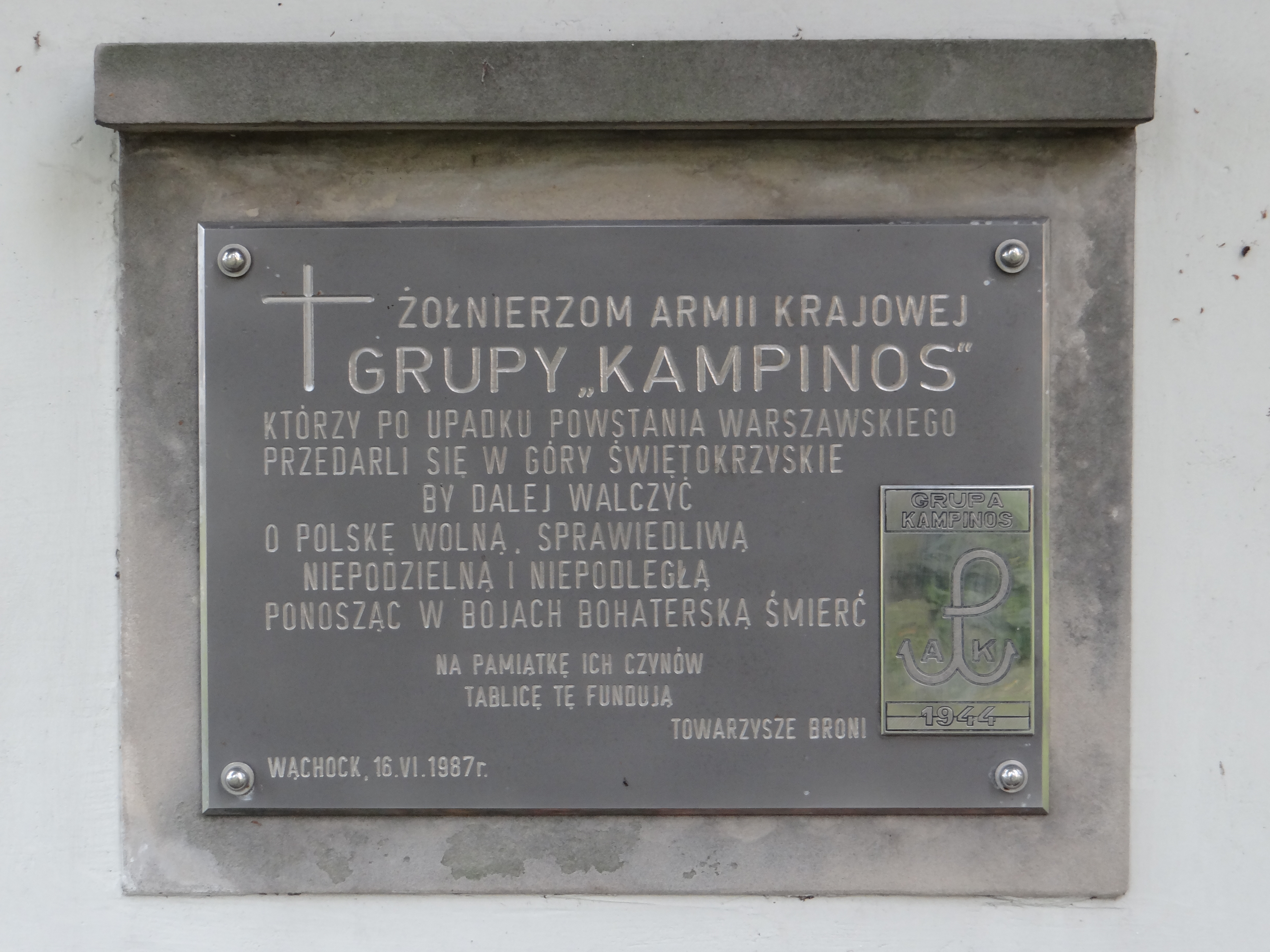
Plaque on the grounds of the Cistercian Wąchock Abbey commemorating the soldiers of the Kampinos Group, who continued fighting in the Kielce-Radom area after the fall of the Warsaw Uprising

On October 1, the command of the 9th Army issued an order to end Operation Sternschnuppe. According to preserved German reports, during the combing of the forest and the pursuit of Home Army units, German forces killed 76 partisans, while another 44 were taken prisoner (this number does not include the losses suffered by the Polish group near Jaktorów). German units also detained 804 able-bodied men. Eight villages were completely destroyed, and a significant number of farms were burned down in another eighteen. Young men suspected of fighting in the ranks of the partisan movement were executed.

After the defeat at Jaktorów, many soldiers of the Kampinos Group continued to fight against the German occupiers. Lieutenant "Dolina" managed to gather nearly 200 survivors, then moved from Puszcza Mariańska to the Opoczno forests, where he established contact with local structures of the Home Army. "Dolina's" soldiers then fought in the ranks of the 25th Ziemia Piotrkowsko-Opoczyńska Infantry Regiment of the Home Army. When the regiment was disbanded after heavy fighting near Wincentów on November 9, "Dolina" formed a cavalry unit of about 60 men, with whom he continued to fight until January 1945. Another 66 soldiers from the Kampinos Group joined the partisan unit of the Home Army led by Lieutenant Antoni Heda, alias "Szary". Until 8 October 1944, the aviation company led by Lieutenant "Lawa" also continued to fight, having separated from the main forces of the Kampinos Group shortly before the battle at Jaktorów.

At least 100 partisans managed to return to the Kampinos Forest, where they hid in very difficult conditions, awaiting the arrival of the Eastern Front. The local underground network, led by Lieutenant Bohdan Jaworski, alias "Wyrwa" (previously the deputy commander of the Palmiry-Młociny Regiment) and Lieutenant Józef Karney, codenamed "Drewno" (previously the commander of the parachute platoon), tried to assist the escapees by providing food, civilian clothing, false documents, and, as far as possible, accommodating them in the hospital in Laski.

=== Summary ===
Between July 29 and September 29, 1944, the units of the Kampinos Group engaged in 47 battles and skirmishes. Ten of these encounters ended in clear victories for the Poles, while in thirteen cases, the enemy's losses far exceeded those of the insurgents. Józef Krzyczkowski reported that during the two-month-long battles, 764 soldiers of the Home Army were killed, and 385 were wounded. The authors of the preface to the monograph "Obroża" in the conspiracy and the Warsaw Uprising estimated the overall losses of the Kampinos Group at 801 killed and 493 wounded. Jerzy Koszada, on the other hand, stated that the losses of the Polish group reached about 900 killed and 500 wounded. During the uprising, dozens of residents of the Kampinos villages were also killed by the Germans. The losses suffered by the Germans in the fights with the Kampinos Group are estimated by Polish historians at about 1,000–1,200 killed and about 400–460 wounded.

The Kampinos Group liberated a significant part of the Kampinos Forest from German occupation for two months, inhabited by several thousand people. Its attacks probably forced the Germans to abandon the use of the Bielany airfield. The presence of a strong partisan group also prevented the Germans from using safe and convenient forest routes leading from Leszno and Warsaw to Kazuń and Modlin and created a threat to an important German communication line, the Warsaw–Modlin road. By engaging significant German forces for two months, (Note: For example, around August 20, there were about 3,200 Germans and Cossacks in the ranks of the units forming a cordon along the Bielany–Babice line. In addition, nearly 3 thousand Hungarians from the 12th Reserve Division were stationed there (Jasiński (2009, pp. 227, 229); Kirchmayer (1984, p. 330)).) the Kampinos Group relieved the insurgent Warsaw, especially the Żoliborz group led by Lieutenant Colonel "Żywieciel". Moreover, as the only organized Home Army unit, it executed the order of General "Bór" from 14 August 1944, regarding the organization of relief for the capital, directing over 900 well-armed soldiers to Żoliborz.

The German command considered the Kampinos Group a serious threat to the rear of the troops fighting in Warsaw and on the Vistula line. In reality, however, the Polish group did not undertake any significant offensive actions in the German rear, especially when the 9th Army was in its greatest crisis. According to Jerzy Kirchmayer and Józef Krzyczkowski, this opportunity was not seized due to the passivity and neglect of the insurgent command. Adam Borkiewicz, summarizing the actions of the Kampinos Group, also concluded that its efforts, due to poor leadership, did not affect the outcome of the Warsaw Uprising.

The Kampinos Group was the only large combat unit of the Warsaw Uprising that did not end the fight with capitulation.

== Organizational structure ==
=== Ordre de Bataille 31 July 1944 ===
On the eve of the Warsaw Uprising, after the incorporation of units from the Stowbtsy-Naliboki Group, the strength and organizational structure of the units of the VIII District were as follows:

- District Command (4 officers, 14 non-commissioned officers, 15 privates, 43 women) (Note: Included under the heading "women" in this list are nurses, liaison officers and female soldiers serving in rear formations (Koszada (2007, pp. 77–80)).)
- Quartermaster and Medical Corps (6 officers, 10 non-commissioned officers, 20 privates, 80 women)
- I Battalion (Lieutenant Janusz Langner, alias "Janusz")
  - command (1 officer, 5 non-commissioned officers, 10 privates, 4 women)
  - 1 company under the command of Lieutenant Zygmunt Sokołowski, alias "Zetes" (1 officer, 12 non-commissioned officers, 160 privates)
  - 3 company under the command of Captain Ignacy Jezierski, alias "Karaś" (2 officers, 40 non-commissioned officers, 125 privates)
  - 5 company under the command of Lieutenant Henryk Dobak, alias "Olsza" (1 officer, 13 non-commissioned officers, 110 privates)
  - assault company under the command of Second Lieutenant Józef Snarski, alias "Czarny" (1 officer, 10 non-commissioned officers, 60 privates)
- II Battalion (Captain Stanisław Nowosad, alias "Dulka")
  - command (3 officers, 2 non-commissioned officers, 5 privates, 3 women)
  - 2 company under the command of Lieutenant Zbigniew Luśniak, alias "Gniew" (1 officer, 18 non-commissioned officers, 150 privates)
  - 4 company under the command of Lieutenant Bolesław Kiełbasa, alias "Gniewosz" (1 officer, 20 non-commissioned officers, 157 privates)
- 78th Regiment of Riflemen Home Army Battalion (Lieutenant Witold Pełczyński, alias "Dźwig") (Note: In this list, officers of the former Stowbtsy-Naliboki Group are listed under the pseudonyms they used until 3 August 1944. With the formation of the Palmiry-Młociny Regiment, some of them took on new pseudonyms. Thus, Lt. "Góra" was henceforth known as "Dolina", Lt. "Dźwig" as "Witold", Cpl. "Noc" as "Nieczaj", watchm. "Dąb" as "Wołodyjowski", and Vt. "Szary" as "Lawina". Under the latter pseudonyms they also appear most often in literature on the Warsaw Uprising (Podgóreczny (2010, p. 42)).)
  - command (2 officers)
  - 1 company under the command of Lieutenant Franciszek Baumgart, alias "Dan" (2 officers, 26 non-commissioned officers, 112 privates, 1 woman)
  - 2 company under the command of Lieutenant Witold Lenczewski, alias "Strzała" (2 officers, 18 non-commissioned officers, 127 privates, 4 women)
  - 3 company under the command of Lieutenant Jerzy Piestrzyński, alias "Helski" (1 officer, 11 non-commissioned officers, 125 privates)
- 1st Squadron of the 27th Uhlan Regiment (Corporal Zdzisław Nurkiewicz, alias "Noc")
  - command (1 officer, 2 women)
  - 1 squadron under the command of Sergeant Jan Jakubowski, alias "Dąb" (18 non-commissioned officers, 59 privates, 1 woman)
  - 2 squadron under the command of Sergeant Józef Niedźwiecki, alias "Szary" (20 non-commissioned officers, 72 privates, 2 women)
  - 3 squadron under the command of Sergeant Midshipman Narcyz Kulikowski, alias "Sum" (9 non-commissioned officers, 62 privates)
  - 4 squadron under the command of Second Lieutenant Aleksander Pietrucki, alias "Jawor" (1 officer, 9 non-commissioned officers, 21 privates, 6 women)
- Machine gun squadron under the command of Lieutenant Jarosław Gąsiewski, alias "Jar", forming the nucleus of the 23rd Grodno Uhlan Regiment (1 officer, 14 non-commissioned officers, 51 privates, 1 woman)
- Military Uprising Protection Service company under the command of Eugeniusz Wyszomirski, alias "Świt" (25 non-commissioned officers, 39 privates)
- Military Women's Service under the command of Lieutenant Zofia Roesler, alias "Polka" (1 officer, 139 women).

=== Ordre de Bataille at the end of September 1944 ===
On the eve of the Operation Sternschnuppe, the strength and structure of the Kampinos Group were as follows:

- Palmiry-Młociny Regiment (Lieutenant Adolf Pilch, alias "Dolina"):
  - regimental command and staff (6 officers, 32 non-commissioned officers, 24 privates, 8 women)
  - quartermaster corps (8 officers, 11 non-commissioned officers, 17 privates, 29 women)
  - I Squadron of the 27th Uhlan Regiment (Captain Zdzisław Nurkiewicz, alias "Nieczaj")
    - command (2 officers, 7 non-commissioned officers, 6 privates, 6 women)
    - 1 squadron under the command of Senior Warrant Officer Jan Jakubowski, alias "Wołodyjowski" (18 non-commissioned officers, 84 privates, 4 women)
    - 2 squadron under the command of Senior Warrant Officer Józef Niedźwiecki, alias "Lawina" (26 non-commissioned officers, 101 privates)
    - 3 squadron under the command of Warrant Officer Midshipman Narcyz Kulikowski, alias "Narcyz" (17 non-commissioned officers, 99 privates, 2 women)
    - 4 squadron under the command of Second Lieutenant Aleksander Pietrucki, alias "Jawor" (1 officer, 25 non-commissioned officers, 59 privates, 2 women)
  - Machine gun squadron under the command of Lieutenant Jarosław Gąsiewski, alias "Jar", forming the nucleus of the 23rd Grodno Uhlan Regiment (3 officers, 42 non-commissioned officers, 83 privates, 1 woman)
  - II Battalion of the 78th Regiment of Riflemen Home Army Battalion (Lieutenant Witold Lenczewski, alias "Strzała")
    - command (4 officers, 8 non-commissioned officers, 13 riflemen, 2 women)
    - 2 company under the command of Second Lieutenant Zygmunt Sokołowski, alias "Zetes" (3 officers, 40 non-commissioned officers, 149 riflemen, 2 women)
    - 3 company under the command of Sergeant Walerian Żuchowicz, alias "Opończa" (3 officers, 25 non-commissioned officers, 125 riflemen, 11 women)
    - machine gun company under the command of Second Lieutenant Henryk Dobak, alias "Olsza" (6 officers, 34 non-commissioned officers, 77 riflemen, 8 women)
    - pioneer platoon (3 officers, 15 non-commissioned officers, 38 riflemen, 1 woman)
    - cavalry reconnaissance platoon (1 officer, 16 non-commissioned officers, 65 riflemen, 3 women)
- Other units of the Kampinos Group:
  - Sochaczew Battalion under the command of Major Władysław Starzyk, alias "Korwin" (30 officers, 451 non-commissioned officers and privates)
  - Legion Battalion under the command of Lieutenant Bolesław Szymkiewicz, alias "Znicz" (15 officers, 170 non-commissioned officers and privates)
  - Zemsta Company under the command of Lieutenant Stefan Matuszczyk, alias "Porawa" (6 officers, 115 non-commissioned officers and privates)
  - Jerzyki Special Assault Companies under the command of Lieutenant Jerzy Strzałkowski, alias "Jerzy" (5 officers, 119 non-commissioned officers and privates)
  - Independent Airborne Special Tasks Company (Note: Adam Borkiewicz placed the airborne company of Lieutenant "Lawa" as part of the infantry battalion of the Palmiry-Młociny Regiment, which, however, is not confirmed by other sources (Borkiewicz (1969, p. 528); Nowak (2011, p. 114)).) under the command of Lieutenant Tadeusz Gaworski, alias "Lawa" (4 officers, 29 non-commissioned officers, 34 riflemen, 3 women)
  - Wiersze Company under the command of Lieutenant Franciszek Wiszniowski, alias "Jurek" (1 officer, 75 non-commissioned officers and privates)
  - smaller units

=== Support units ===
The Quartermaster of the VIII District, later transformed into the Quartermaster of the Kampinos Group, was led by Captain Wojciech Dwornicki, alias "Wojtek". His deputy was Second Lieutenant Aleksander Wolski, alias "Jastrząb".

The radio center organized at the command of the VIII District (later the Kampinos Group) was directed by Captain Aleksander Jedliński, alias "Franek". His deputy was Captain Stefan Jachowicz, alias "Dębina". Since 4 August 1944, the radio center in Kampinos Forest maintained communication with Polish radio centers in London and Italy.

At the end of August 1944, the position of the head of the medical corps of the Kampinos Group was assumed by Captain Dr. Cyprian Sadowski, alias "Skiba". Medical care for wounded and sick soldiers and civilians was provided by:

- A hospital at the institution for the blind in Laski, led by Dr. Kazimierz Cebertowicz, alias "Świerk". The hospital operated in the territory controlled by the Germans, so medical assistance was provided to the wounded insurgents under clandestine conditions;
- a field hospital in Krogulec, led by Dr. Antoni Banis, alias "Kleszczyk";
- field reserve hospitals in Kuszczew and Gawartowa Wola, led by Dr. Zdzisław Askamas, alias "Dąb";
- a medical point in Dąbrowa Leśna, intended for lightly wounded, led by Dr. Longinus Pajewski, alias "Adam II".

The role of chaplains in the Kampinos Group was fulfilled by: Father Jerzy Baszkiewicz, alias "Radwan II", Father Wacław Karłowicz, alias "Andrzej Bobola," and Father Hilary Praczyński, alias "Gwardian" (the latter arrived from the Eastern Borderlands with the Naliboki Group). During the occupation and the uprising, active involvement in underground activities was also undertaken by the chaplain of the hospital in Laski, Father Stefan Wyszyński, alias "Radwan III" (later the Primate of Poland).

== Commemoration ==
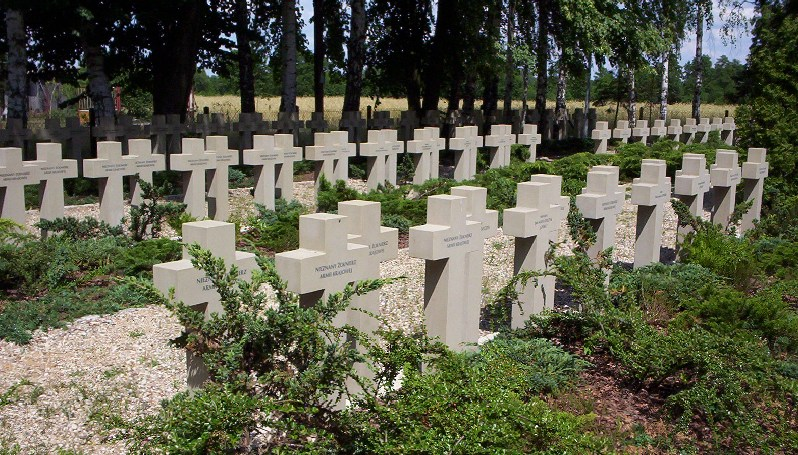
The cemetery in Budy Zosine. Resting there are 132 soldiers of the Kampinos Group killed near Jaktorów

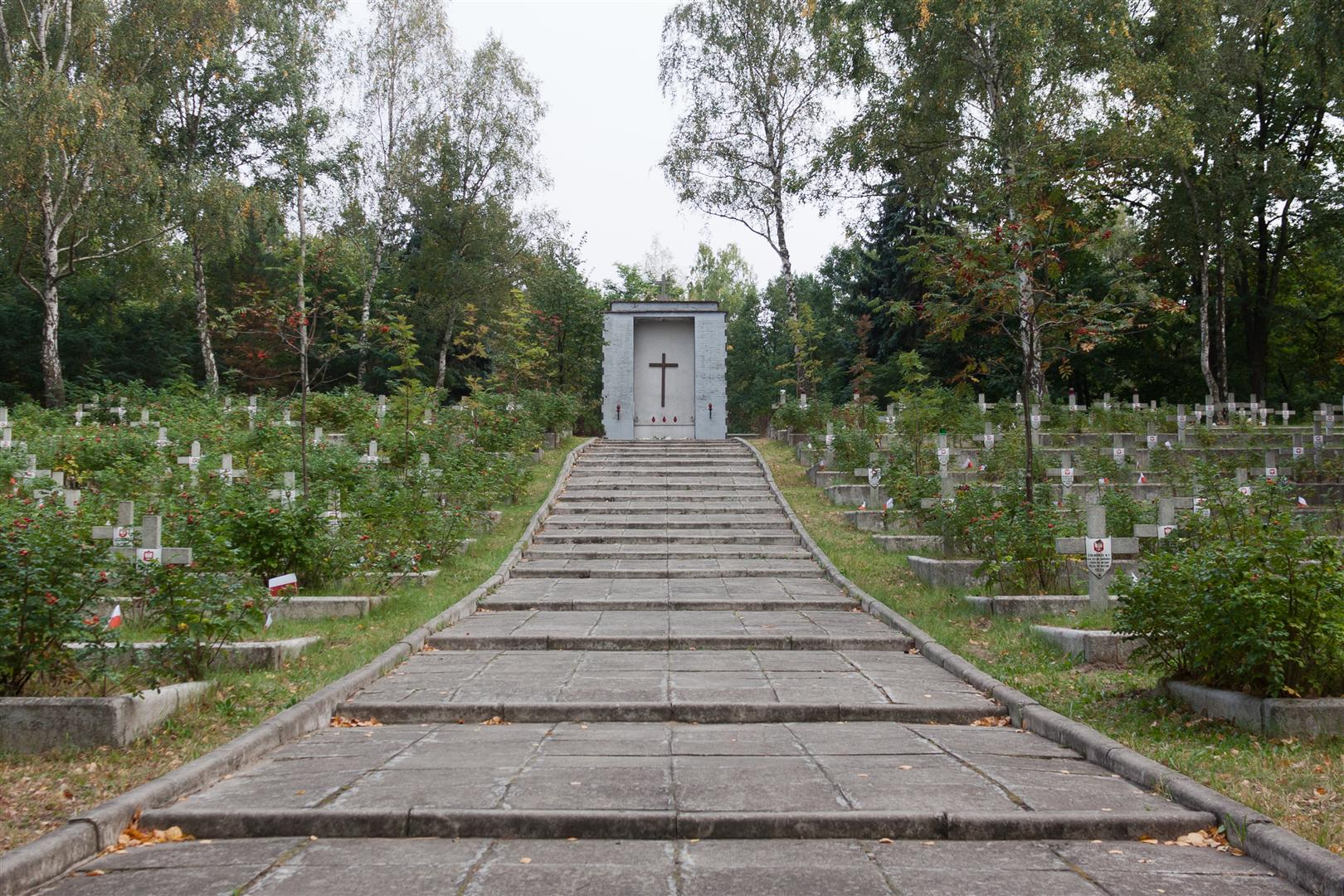
War cemetery in Laski, where, in addition to several hundred soldiers killed in September 1939, rest the remains of Home Army soldiers killed in the attacks on Bielany airfield

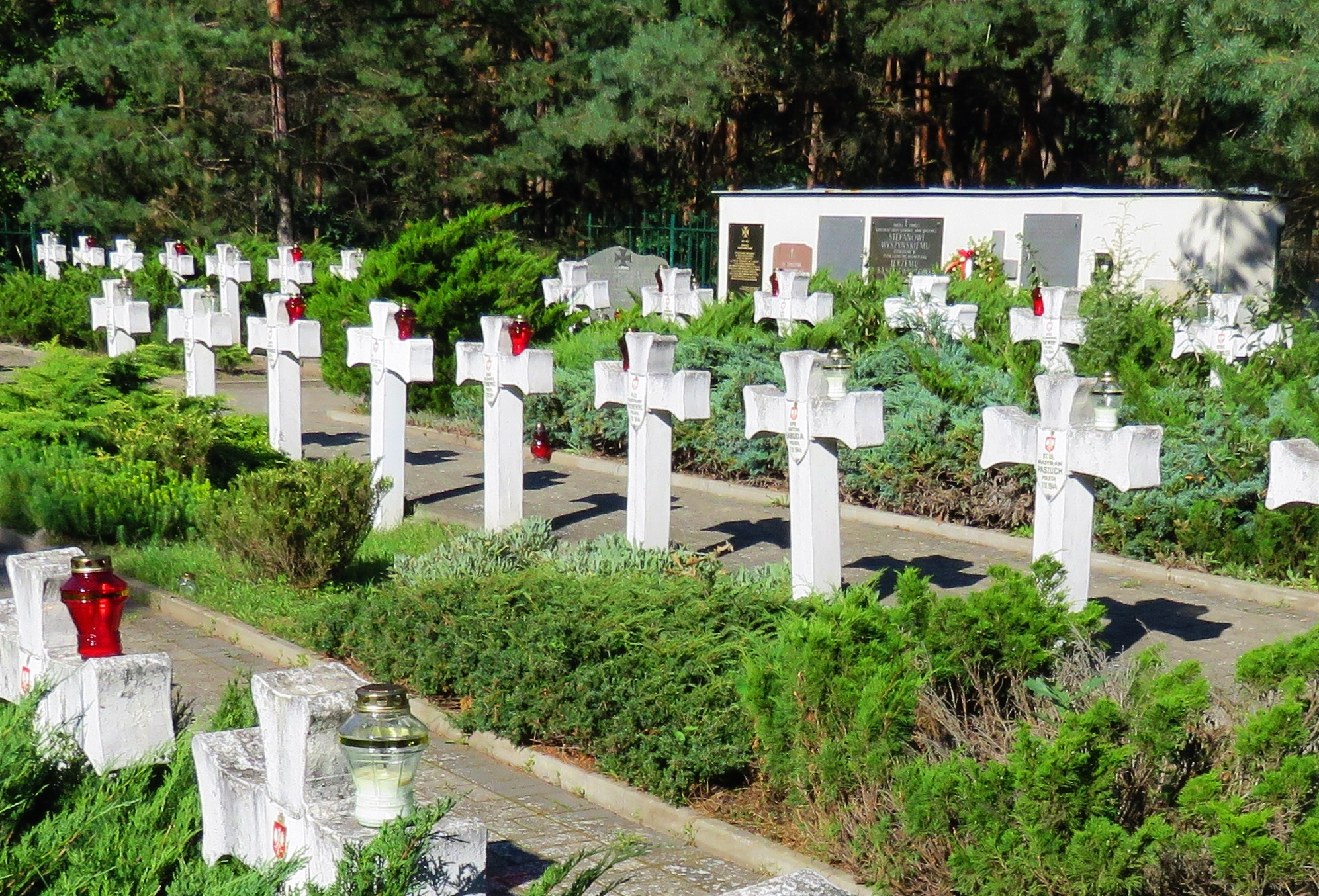
Partisan cemetery in Wiersze

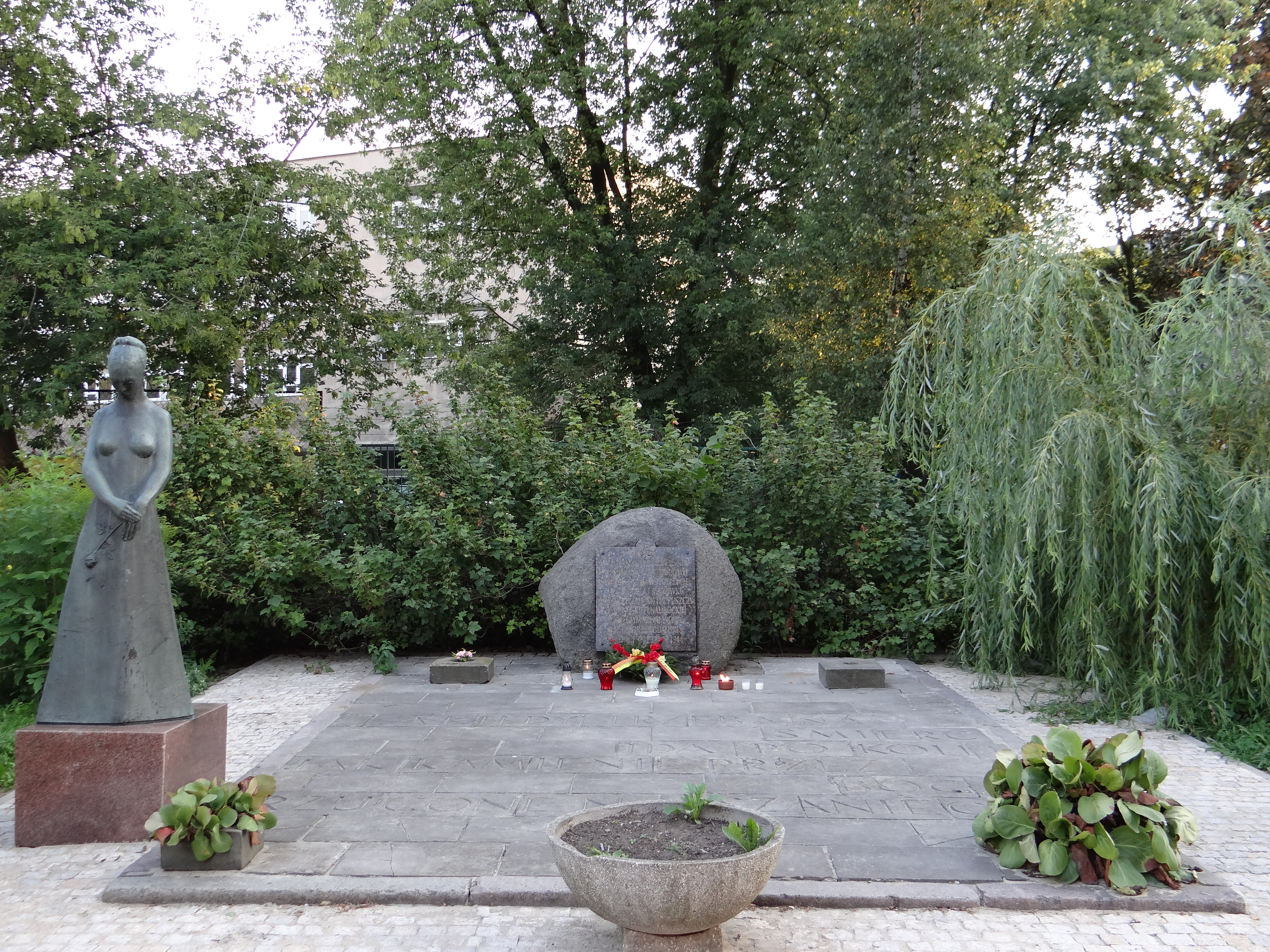
Monument to Home Army soldiers killed in attacks on Warszawa Gdańska railway station on Mickiewicza Street in Warsaw

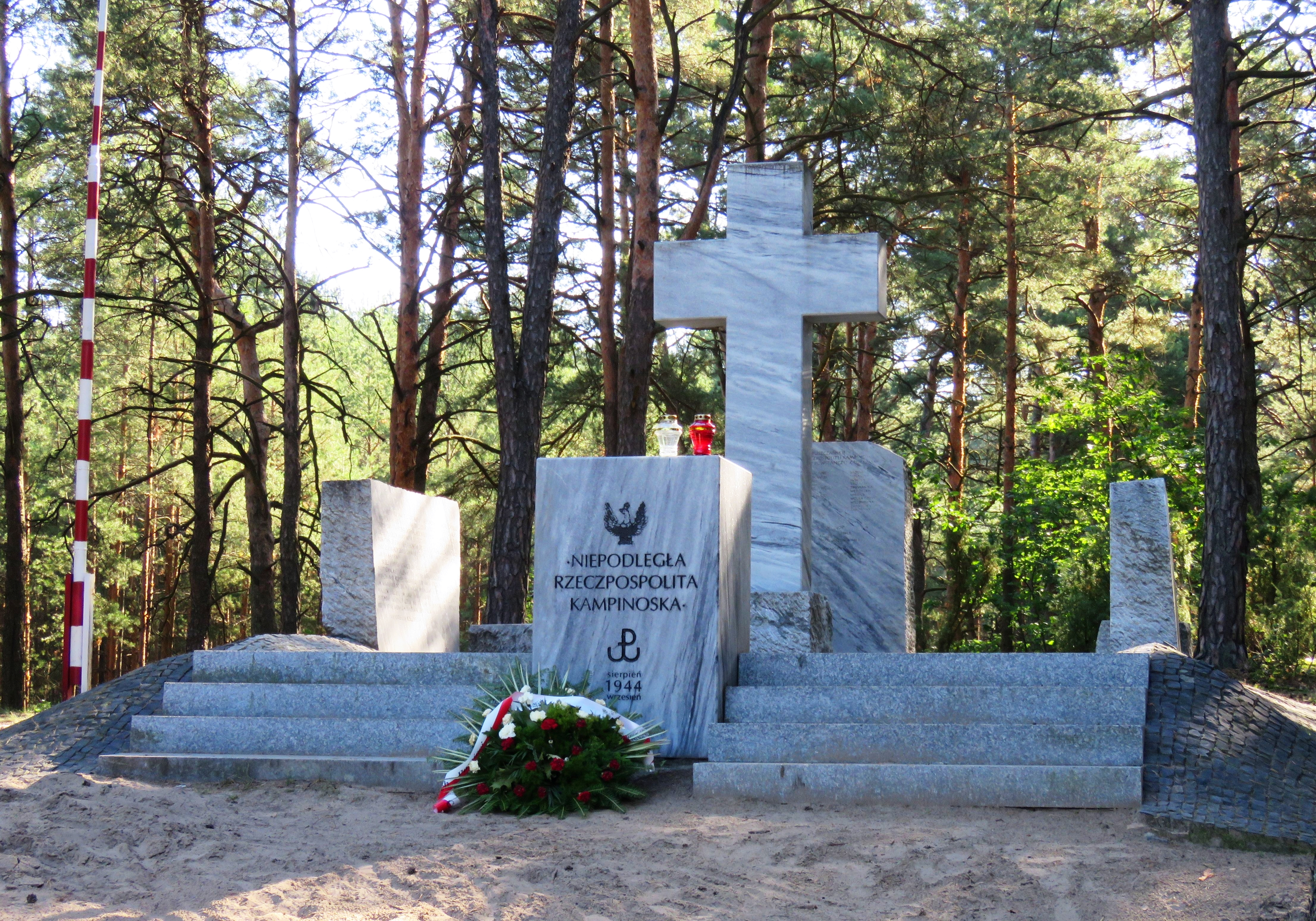
Monument to the "Independent Republic of Kampinos" in Wiersze

In the early years of the Polska Ludowa, efforts to commemorate the armed actions of the Kampinos Group encountered numerous obstacles from the communist authorities. In 1946, Polish Workers' Party squads from Leszno vandalized the partisan cemetery in Wiersze. In the 1950s, the communist authorities also decided to liquidate the cemetery of the soldiers of the Kampinos Group in Budy Zosine, ordering the transfer of the remains to the Warsaw Insurgents Cemetery.

Despite the unfavorable political conditions, the veteran community centered around the first commander of the Kampinos Group, Captain Józef Krzyczkowski, alias "Szymon", quickly developed energetic activity. One of the first initiatives of the veterans was to ensure a dignified burial for soldiers killed in the attacks on the Bielany airfield and to secure individual partisan graves in the forest. The Polish October also allowed for the reconstruction of the neglected and vandalized cemetery in Wiersze. Moreover, as a result of numerous efforts and interventions by veterans, the state authorities agreed to rebuild the cemetery in Budy Zosine and to relocate the remains of soldiers who fell near Jaktorów.

At the beginning of the second decade of the 21st century, the armed actions of the soldiers of the Kampinos Group were commemorated in the following ways:

- Budy Zosine – the remains of 132 soldiers of the Kampinos Group who fell in the Battle of Jaktorów rest in the military cemetery in Budy Zosine. In 2004, through the efforts of the Council for the Protection of Struggle and Martyrdom Sites, the cemetery was modernized. The monument, which had been there since 1964, was replaced with a granite cross.
- Dąbrowa Leśna – there is a monument commemorating, among others, the soldiers of the youth company who fought in the ranks of the Kampinos Group, located on Partyzantów Street.
- Dziekanów Polski – a plaque commemorating the stay of the soldiers of the Stowbtsy-Naliboki Group in the village is located on the school grounds.
- Laski:
  - at the Róża Czacka Educational and Rehabilitation Center for Blind Children, there is a memorial plaque informing that a hospital of the Kampinos Group operated on the premises during the Warsaw Uprising. There is also a plaque commemorating the friendly relations between soldiers of the Hungarian II Reserve Corps and the Warsaw insurgents and inhabitants of the Kampinos villages;
  - at the military cemetery in Laski, next to several hundred soldiers who fell in September 1939, the remains of soldiers of the Kampinos Group who died in attacks on the Bielany airfield and members of the VIII District conspiracy rest.
- Leszno – there is a monument on the city square commemorating the soldiers of the Kampinos Group as well as the inhabitants of Leszno who died and were murdered in the years 1939–1945.
- Truskaw – in August 1971, a commemorative stone and plaque were unveiled at the crossroads leading from Izabelin and Borzęcin to Pociecha, dedicated to the soldiers of the Polish Army, the Home Army, and the residents of Truskaw and neighboring villages who died and were murdered during World War II. In September 2002, another plaque was unveiled at the monument, commemorating the victorious raid of Lieutenant "Dolina's" unit on the night of 3 September 1944.
  - Pociecha – on a small hill surrounded by a wall, there is a monument honoring the soldiers of the Jerzyki Company who died defending the village from August 28 to September 2, 1944. The monument consists of a stylized cross and an angled plaque.
- Warsaw:
  - on 29 September 1957, at the intersection of Adam Mickiewicz and Gen. Zajączka streets in Żoliborz, a monument was unveiled in honor of the soldiers of the Home Army who fell in attacks on the Warszawa Gdańska railway station. Initially, it was a boulder placed on a pedestal. In 1974, the monument was supplemented with a sculpture by Irena Nadachowska, depicting a woman with a rose in her hand;
  - in the 1970s, a concrete plaque commemorating the soldiers of the Home Army who fell in attacks on the Bielany airfield was installed on the edge of the Dęby Młocińskie reserve, opposite property No. 10 on Michalina Street. In 1994, the memorial site was supplemented with a commemorative boulder, and in 2015, a new monument in the form of a plaque and obelisk was unveiled there. Behind the monument, several dozen meters into the forest, there is also a symbolic grave of Home Army soldiers who fell on 2 August 1944;
  - on the wall of the St. Mary Magdalene Church at 64 Wólczyńska Street in Wawrzyszew, there is a plaque commemorating 900 soldiers of the Kampinos Group who died in the Warsaw Uprising, including 450 who died in attacks on the Warszawa Gdańska railway station;
  - inside the St. Stanislaus Kostka Church in Żoliborz, there is a plaque commemorating the soldiers of the Stowbtsy-Nalibocki Group, including their participation in battles in the Kampinos Forest, attacks on the Warszawa Gdańska railway station, and the defense of Żoliborz;
  - in the section for the "Żywiciel" soldiers at the Powązki Military Cemetery, soldiers of the Żoliborz District, as well as soldiers of the Kampinos Group who died in attacks on the Warszawa Gdańska railway station and in the defense of Żoliborz, rest;
  - by a resolution of the Warsaw City Council on 8 July 2004, the name Kampinos Group was given to one of the previously unnamed streets in the Mokotów district of Warsaw, located in the vicinity of the Warsaw Uprising Mound. In 2006, the Wincentego Pstrowskiego Street in the Bielany district of the capital was renamed to Kampinos Group Street.
- Wąchock – within the premises of the Cistercian abbey, there is a plaque commemorating the soldiers of the Kampinos Group who continued fighting in the Kielce-Radom Land after the fall of the Warsaw Uprising.
- Wiersze:
  - at the partisan cemetery, the remains of 54 Home Army soldiers who fell during battles in the Kampinos Forest are laid to rest. Additionally, there is an urn containing soil collected from twenty-two battlegrounds in the Kampinos Forest and several commemorative plaques within the cemetery;
  - on 22 August 2004, on the occasion of the 60th anniversary of the Warsaw Uprising and the 45th anniversary of the establishment of the Kampinos National Park, a monument To the Independent Republic of Kampinos was unveiled in Wiersze;
  - on the wall of the church in Wiersze, built after the war on the site of the former parade ground, there is a plaque commemorating field masses attended by soldiers of the Kampinos Group, which took place at this location during the existence of the "Independent Republic of Kampinos".

In Hornówek, Izabelin, Kampinos, Opaleń, Sieraków, Truskaw, and Zaborów, there are also monuments and plaques commemorating the residents of these localities who lost their lives during World War II, including soldiers of the Łęgi District of the Warsaw County Subdistrict and members of their families who perished and were murdered in the years 1943–1944. In Kiełpin, there is also a monument erected at the initiative of veterans of the Kampinos Group, commemorating the crew of the American B-17 aircraft shot down on 18 September 1944 over Dziekanów Leśny during a supply mission to the Warsaw Uprising.

In 1996, the Kampinos Group was awarded a commemorative medal "IV Centuries of Warsaw's Capitality".

== Bibliography ==
- Bartelski, Lesław (2002). "Obroża". Przewodnik historyczny po miejscach walk i pamięci. Warsaw: Fundacja "Wystawa Warszawa Walczy 1939–1945" and Wydawnictwo "Askon". ISBN 83-87545-48-1.
- Bielecki, Robert; Kulesza, Juliusz (1996). Przeciw konfidentom i czołgom. Oddział 993/W Kontrwywiadu Komendy Głównej AK i batalion AK "Pięść" w konspiracji i Powstaniu Warszawskim 1944 roku. Warsaw: Radwan-Wano. ISBN 83-906159-1-6.
- Bonarowski, Edward (2014). Burza nad Dworcem Gdańskim. W bój – bez broni. Kraków: Oficyna Wydawnicza Mireki. ISBN 978-83-64452-09-3.
- Borkiewicz, Adam (1969). Powstanie warszawskie. Zarys działań natury wojskowej. Warsaw: Instytut Wydawniczy "Pax".
- Szatsznajder, Jan (1991). "Tajemniczy pan "Antoni"". Drogi do Polski. Wrocław: Presstrust.
- Chowaniec, Krystyna (2018). Wspomnienia i relacje Stefana Grzyba – kuriera trasy "Las" i powstańca warszawskiego. Sanok: Stowarzyszenie Wychowawców "Eleusis" w Sanoku.
- Ciepłowski, Stanisław (2004). Wpisane w kamień i spiż. Inskrypcje pamiątkowe w Warszawie XVIII–XX w. Warsaw: Argraf. ISBN 83-912463-4-5.
- Gozdawa-Gołębiowski, Jan (1992). Obszar Warszawski Armii Krajowej. Lublin: Redakcja Wydawnictw Katolickiego Uniwersytetu Lubelskiego. ISBN 83-228-0136-X.
- Jasiński, Grzegorz (2009). Żoliborz 1944. Pruszków: Oficyna Wydawnicza "Ajaks". ISBN 978-83-62046-03-4.
- Kirchmayer, Jerzy (1984). Powstanie Warszawskie. Warsaw: Książka i Wiedza. ISBN 83-05-11-080-X.
- Koszada, Jerzy (2007). "Grupa Kampinos". Partyzanckie zgrupowanie Armii Krajowej walczące w Powstaniu Warszawskim. Warsaw: ZP GRUPA Sp. z o.o. ISBN 978-83-925916-6-5.
- Koźniewski, Jan; Nowakowski, Marek Tadeusz (2000). Lawiacy. Historia kompanii lotniczej AK. Warsaw: Wydawnictwo Askon. ISBN 83-87545-30-9.
- Krzyczkowski, Józef (1962). Konspiracja i powstanie w Kampinosie. Warsaw: Ludowa Spółdzielnia Wydawnicza.
- Nowak, Szymon (2011). Puszcza Kampinoska – Jaktorów 1944. Warsaw: Bellona. ISBN 9788311121416.
- Osowski, Jarosław (2006-12-01). "Jak Wincenty Pstrowski nie wyrobił ostatniej normy". warszawa.wyborcza.pl.
- Pilch, Adolf (2013). Partyzanci trzech puszcz. Kraków: Oficyna Wydawnicza Mireki. ISBN 978-83-89533-92-0.
- Podgóreczny, Marian (2010). Doliniacy. Niepodległa Rzeczpospolita Kampinoska. Vol. II. Warsaw: BMT ERIDIA. ISBN 978-83-930539-3-3.
- Podlewski, Stanisław (1979). Rapsodia żoliborska. Warsaw: Instytut Wydawniczy "Pax". ISBN 83-211-0009-0.
- Sawicki, Jacek Zygmunt (2002). "Obroża" w konspiracji i Powstaniu Warszawskim. Dzieje Armii Krajowej na przedpolu Warszawy. Warsaw: Bellona. ISBN 83-11-09407-1.
- Sawicki, Tadeusz (2010). Rozkaz zdławić powstanie. Niemcy i ich sojusznicy w walce z powstaniem warszawskim. Warsaw: Bellona. ISBN 978-83-11-11892-8.
- Zieliński, Jarosław (2015). Bielany. Przewodnik historyczny. Warsaw: Wydawnictwo RM. ISBN 978-83-7773-446-9.
