= Insurgent attacks on the Bielany airfield =

Unsuccessful attempt to capture the Bielany airfield in Warsaw

- Part of Warsaw Uprising
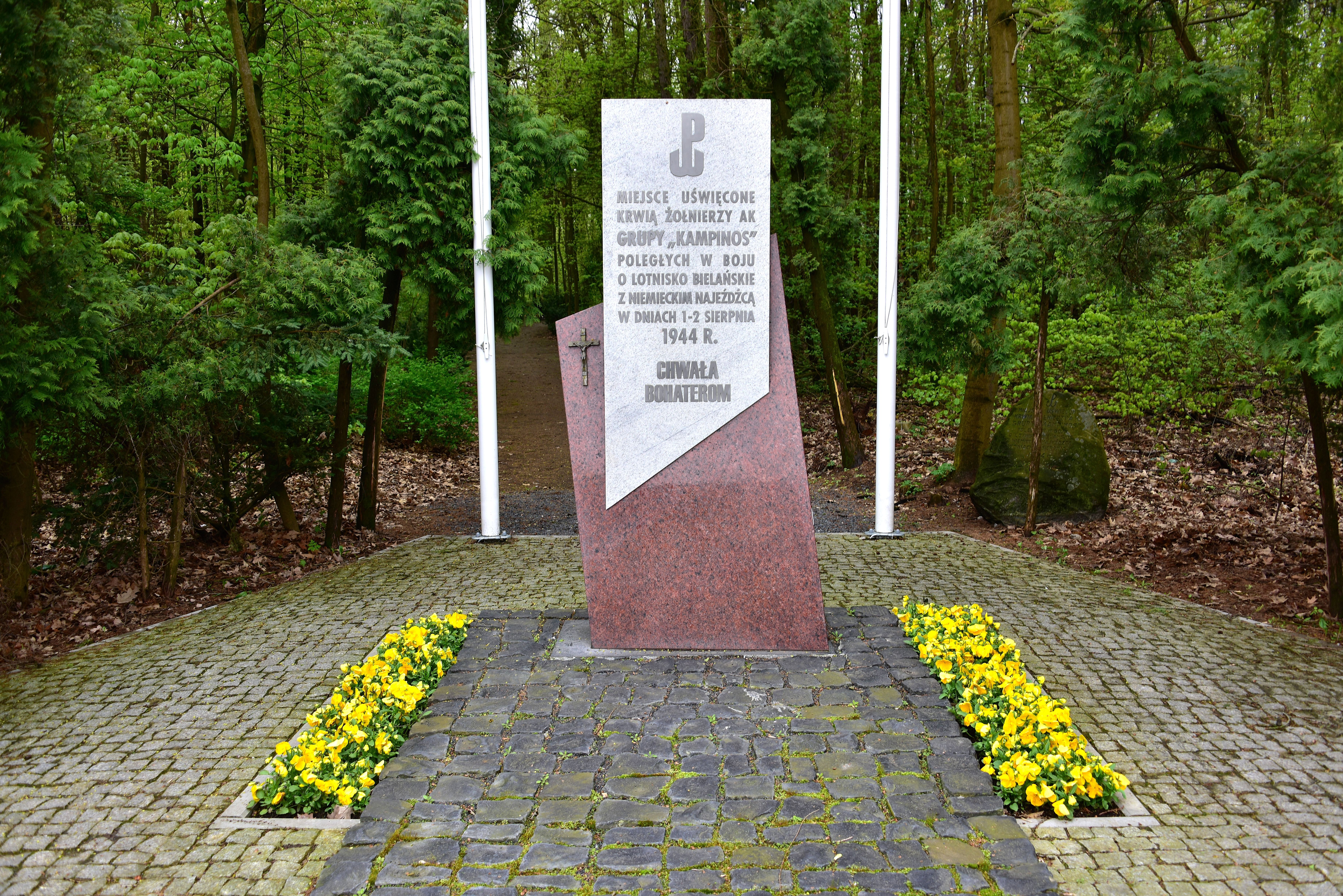
- Monument on Michalina Street in Warsaw commemorating the soldiers of the Kampinos Group who died in the attacks on the Bielany airfield
Date	1–2 August 1944
Location	Bielany
Result	German victory

Belligerents
Polish Underground State	Nazi Germany

Commanders and leaders
Józef Krzyczkowski; Adolf Pilch; Władysław Nowakowski	unknown

Strength
190 soldiers (the first assault of the 8th District); 400 soldiers (Bielany troops); 984 soldiers (second assault of the 8th District)	about 1,200 soldiers, including about 700 directly in the area of the airfield armored weapons anti-aircraft artillery and man-portable anti-tank systems air support

Casualties and losses
5 killed and 12 wounded (first assault); 31 killed and 45 wounded (second assault); 1 killed and 2 wounded (battle on Modlin road)	6 killed and 10 wounded (first assault); 20 killed and 30 wounded, armored car (second assault); 34–41 killed and 17 cars (battle on Modlin road)

The insurgent attacks on the Bielany airfield were an unsuccessful attempt by the Home Army soldiers to capture the Bielany airfield in Warsaw during the early days of the Warsaw Uprising in 1944.

In the insurgents' plans, capturing the Bielany airfield was highly prioritized. The task was assigned to soldiers from the VIII Region Łęgi of the Warsaw County Subdistrict, supported by part of the forces from the Żoliborz Subdistrict. Despite the significant reinforcement brought by the arrival of nearly 900 soldiers from the Stowbtsy-Naliboki Group to the Kampinos Forest, the Kampinos and Żoliborz units were too poorly armed and too few in number to seize the heavily fortified airfield and the neighboring German strongholds. The first attack, carried out on 1 August 1944, at "W" Hour, was purely demonstrative. The second attack, launched early on August 2, was repelled after many hours of fighting, resulting in heavy Polish casualties.

As a result of this failure, the Kampinos units remained incapable of conducting significant offensive operations until mid-August 1944. Soon after repelling the Polish attacks, the Germans permanently ceased using the airfield.

== Airfield and its crew ==
The construction of the Bielany airfield began before the outbreak of World War II. Initially, it was intended to function as a sports airfield. By September 1939, the runway had been marked and prepared, but no buildings had been erected. After the German occupation began, the unfinished airfield was taken over by the German Air Force. It was used by the Germans during the invasion of the Soviet Union in June 1941 and later served as a base for four German reconnaissance units, a transit airfield, and a training center. Simultaneously, the Germans began expanding the airfield's infrastructure. By summer 1944, the base included, among other facilities, a control and observation tower, four hangars, transmitter stations, and refueling points. The runway was 700 m long.

The airfield's support and additional security were provided by a complex of fortified structures and defensive points located in Bielany and nearby villages. The most important of these included:

- Horstlager – a complex of several small barracks adjacent to the airfield tarmac (from Marymoncka Street). The camouflaged barracks among the trees housed mainly utility rooms and officer quarters.
- The complex of buildings of the University of Physical Education at 34 Marymoncka Street, converted into barracks for an aviation regiment during the German occupation. The university complex secured the approach to the airfield from the south. It was fenced with barbed wire and fortified with shooting positions, machine gun nests, and anti-aircraft artillery positions. Additional guard posts were placed in nearby buildings.
- Waldlager – a complex of twelve one- and two-story barracks defending the approach to the university complex from the east and south. This facility was secured by makeshift earth fortifications and a barbed wire fence.
- The Camaldolese Church in the Bielany Forest, adjacent to Horstlager. It was secured by two concrete bunkers and several shooting positions.
- Bautruppen-Lager in the village of Wawrzyszew, intended for personnel and workers. The size of the permanent crew and details of the fortification of this complex are unknown.

The Germans attached great importance to securing the Bielany airfield. Fortified defensive positions were established in villages north of the base, and two anti-aircraft artillery batteries were stationed there. The airfield area was partially secured with a barbed wire fence. After a successful sabotage operation carried out by Kedyw soldiers of the Home Army on the night between May 3 and 4, 1944, the Germans further tightened security measures, increasing the crew size and building additional defensive positions. By 13 May 1944, four anti-aircraft gun batteries on tracked chassis were stationed at the edge of the airfield. A month later, the base's crew was reinforced with an additional 20 anti-aircraft guns brought from the university area and outside Warsaw. Moreover, the airfield area was expanded at the expense of houses in one of the nearby villages.

On the eve of the Warsaw Uprising, the Bielany airfield and its surrounding facilities were one of the most important German resistance centers in northern Warsaw. According to Grzegorz Jasiński's findings, on 1 August 1944, the German defensive points in Bielany were manned as follows:

- The airfield tarmac, along with Horstlager buildings and Bautruppen-Lager barracks in Wawrzyszew, was defended by a crew of about 500, including the German Air Force Alarm-Bataillon Weckerle. Also stationed there was the 1st Battery of the 769th Light Anti-Aircraft Artillery Division, (Note: Home Army intelligence estimated that the airfield could have been defended by up to two batteries of this squadron, deployed respectively on the tarmac and north of it (Jasiński (2009, p. 62)).) equipped with 12 guns (including 37 mm caliber guns).
- In the village of Placówka, located a few hundred meters northwest of the airfield tarmac, the command post of the 378th Searchlight Battalion was located.
- In the village of Wólka Węglowa, there were two searchlights secured by a platoon of German Air Force soldiers.
- The university complex was defended by about 250 soldiers.
- Waldlager was defended by about 100 soldiers.
- The Camaldolese Church housed 20 Germans, 20 Turkmens, and 20 Czechs.
- In the buildings at 16 Zuga Street in Bielany, several dozen soldiers were quartered, guarding 80 foreign workers employed there.

In reality, at the outbreak of the Warsaw Uprising, the German forces in Bielany were much larger. Shortly before the "W" Hour, the crews of the local defensive points were reinforced with additional subunits equipped with heavy weapons. The garrison of the university, Waldlager, and the church alone was strengthened to about 700 soldiers supported by armored cars and tanks. (Note: Jasiński (2009, pp. 62–63) surmised that this reinforcement consisted of subunits of the 80th Anti-Aircraft Artillery Regiment and the 3rd Cossack Regiment.) Thus, at the "W" Hour, the German forces in the airfield area and its neighboring facilities could not have been fewer than 1,200 soldiers supported by anti-aircraft artillery, as well as armored and anti-tank weapons. Additionally, in nearby Boernerowo, where German Air Force vehicle workshops were guarded by several dozen auxiliary soldiers, about 100 Ukrainian collaborators and subunits of the 1st Fallschirm-Panzer Division Hermann Göring were stationed. In case of a significant threat to the airfield, these units could come to its garrison's aid.

== Forces and plans of the Home Army ==
In the insurgent plans, capturing the Bielany airfield was of significant importance. Initially, Home Army staff officers anticipated that the airfield would be bombed by Allied aircraft at the outbreak of the uprising, similar to airfields in Okęcie and Grójec. Subsequently, Home Army units were to strike the defenders, shaken by the bombing, secure the airfield, and staff it with pre-trained personnel. Success in this operation was expected to facilitate the transfer of soldiers from the 1st Independent Parachute Brigade and Polish air squadrons from the United Kingdom to Warsaw.

The main role in capturing the Bielany airfield was assigned to the units of the VIII Łęgi District of the Warsaw County Subdistrict. This district was commanded by Captain Józef Krzyczkowski, codenamed Szymon, who oversaw Home Army structures in the pre-war municipalities of Czosnów, Młociny, and the eastern part of Zaborów. According to the insurgent plans, at the "W" Hour, the main forces of the VIII District were to concentrate in the hills 93, 103, and 96 at Łuże Hill and then strike the German positions protecting the airfield from the north. After breaking through the enemy defenses, Szymon's soldiers were to take over the airfield and Horstlager buildings (the latter in cooperation with Żoliborz units). Other units of the VIII District were to capture the factory in Łomianki and the workshops in Dziekanów Leśny, seize transport means on the Vistula, and block the Warsaw–Modlin road at the Młociny Forest. Additionally, they planned to conduct offensive operations towards Kazuń once reinforcements from the Błonie District arrived.

At the outbreak of the uprising, the VIII District was expected to field two infantry battalions, commanded by Lieutenant Janusz Langner, codenamed Janusz, and Captain Stanisław Nowosad, codenamed Dulka. On the eve of the uprising, both battalions had reached their full strength with five front-line companies each. Two Military Uprising Protection Service platoons and Women's Military Service structures were also formed. In July 1944, two youth company platoons from the III Dęby District (Rembertów) were assigned to the Łęgi District. These were commanded by cadets Janusz Warmiński, codenamed Murzyn, and Wojciech Pecyński, codenamed Polana, and consisted primarily of young boys from the Dąbrowa Leśna and Łomianki areas. Simultaneously, in preparation for the uprising, weapons and ammunition were being stockpiled. However, armament remained one of the VIII District's weakest points. Captain Szymon stated in his post-war memoirs that after mobilization in July 1944, the VIII District's units had only between 350 and 400 armed soldiers. Edward Bonarowski claimed that the Łęgi District's forces did not exceed 440 armed soldiers, mostly equipped with weapons from September 1939.

Insurgent plans anticipated that while the Łęgi District units attacked the airfield from the north, the III Bielany District units of the Żoliborz Subdistrict would capture the key German defensive points in Bielany. They were then to attack the airfield from the south and, in cooperation with the VIII District units, seize the Horstlager buildings. Captain Władysław Nowakowski, codenamed Serb, commanded the III District. The specific tasks of his subunits were as follows: (Note: During the planning stage of the insurgent operation, some officers of the Żoliborz Subdistrict argued that due to the weak armament of their units, the number of attack targets should be reduced. They suggested that in the initial phase of the fighting, the focus should be on blocking the strongest points of German resistance until the soldiers could be rearmed by capturing weaker targets. However, these reservations were dismissed by the command of the Warsaw District, which believed that a sudden and simultaneous assault on all German positions in Warsaw would surprise and overpower the enemy garrison. According to the operational order from the Warsaw District command on 25 July 1944, the Żoliborz Subdistrict was tasked with attacking 18 "combat objectives". The III District was assigned the task of capturing Horstlager, the university building complex, the "Tailoring School" buildings at 66 Zabłocińska/Marymoncka Street, and the church in Bielany Forest. Additionally, the Żoliborz Subdistrict staff decided that apart from the targets specified in the district command's order, all objects previously considered primary tactical targets in the area's plans would also be attacked. For the III District, these additional targets included: Waldlager – to be captured by frontline units, as well as Bautruppen-Lager in Wawrzyszew and the primary school at 16 Zuga Street – to be captured and attacked by Military Uprising Protection Service (Jasiński (2009, pp. 115–116, 122); Podlewski (1979, pp. 10, 18)).)

- Second Lieutenant Stanisław Rudowicz's company, codenamed Brzoza (platoons: 211, 213, 214), along with Lieutenant Marian Redwan's company, codenamed Ojciec Marian (platoons: 255 and 256), were to attack the university complex from the northwest (from Marymoncka Street).
- Lieutenant Jerzy Terczyński's company, codenamed Starża (platoons: 212, 237, 239), had two tasks. One platoon, supported by a section of assault engineers, was to attack the "Tailoring School" buildings at 66 Zabłocińska/Marymoncka Street. Meanwhile, the remaining two platoons, supported by two sections of assault engineers, were to strike the Waldlager buildings from the southeast and then continue the assault towards the university.
- Second Lieutenant Jerzy Zdrodowski's company, codenamed Kwarciany (platoons: 247, 248, 249, 250 motorized), also had two tasks. One platoon, supported by an assault engineers section, was to capture the church. The other three platoons were to attack Waldlager from the northeast and then support the assault on the university.
- Military Uprising Protection Service platoons were to build eight barricades on the main communication arteries of Bielany and capture or isolate weaker German resistance points.

The III District was one of the most populous but also one of the most poorly armed districts of the Żoliborz Subdistrict. According to Grzegorz Jasiński's findings, on 31 July 1944, the III District had 941 soldiers (875 front-line soldiers and 65 Military Uprising Protection Service soldiers), including 81 women. (Note: Included as “women” in this list are: nurses, liaison officers and female soldiers serving in rear formations.) However, at the same time, the III District had only 2 PIAT grenade launchers, 45 rifles with 4,500 rounds, 8 submachine guns with 800 rounds, 44 pistols with 1,880 rounds, and 1,776 grenades.

=== Arrival of Góra's group ===
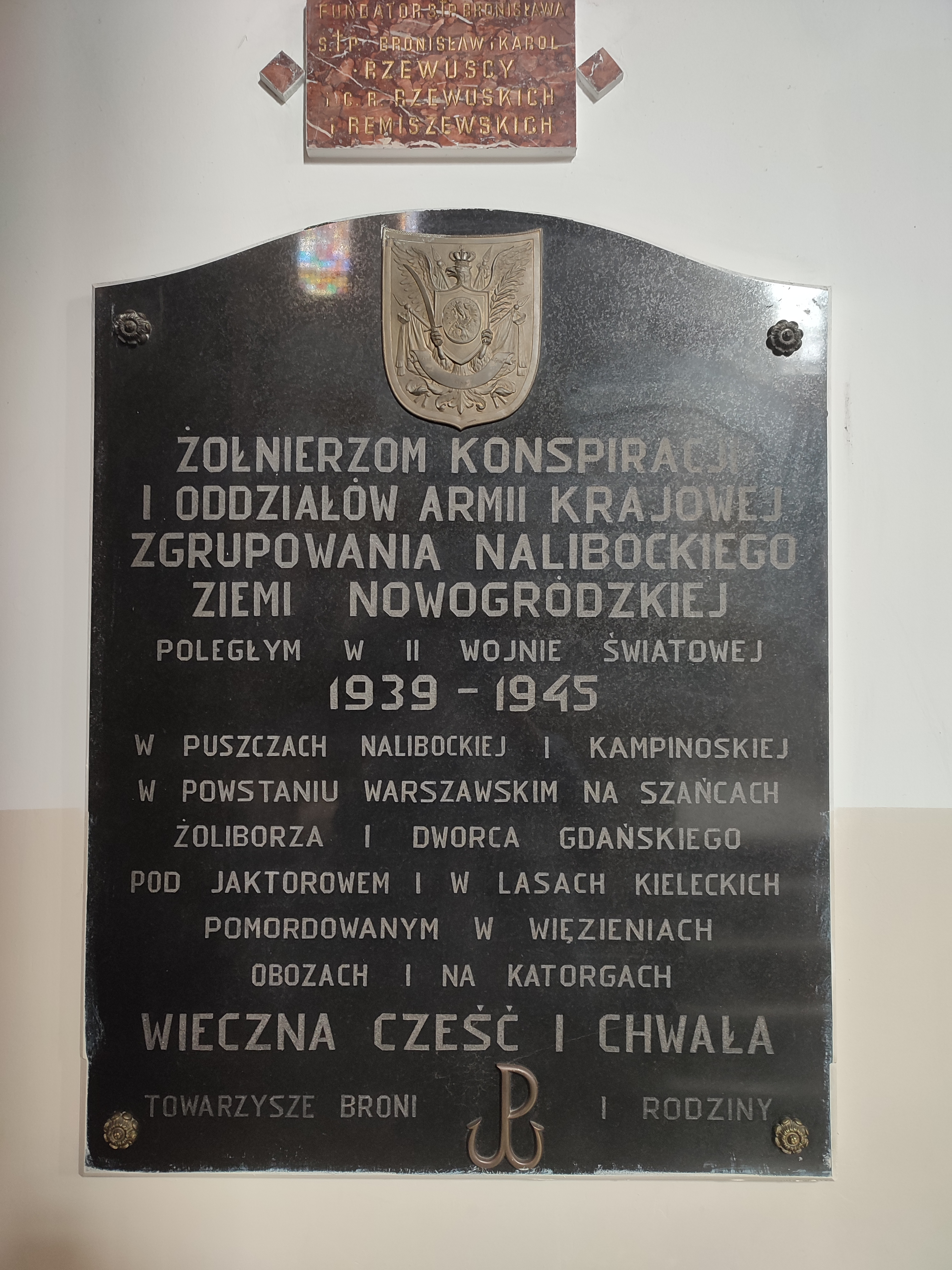
Commemorative plaque on the St. Stanislaus Kostka Church honors soldiers of the Stowbtsy-Naliboki Group for their participation in the Warsaw Uprising

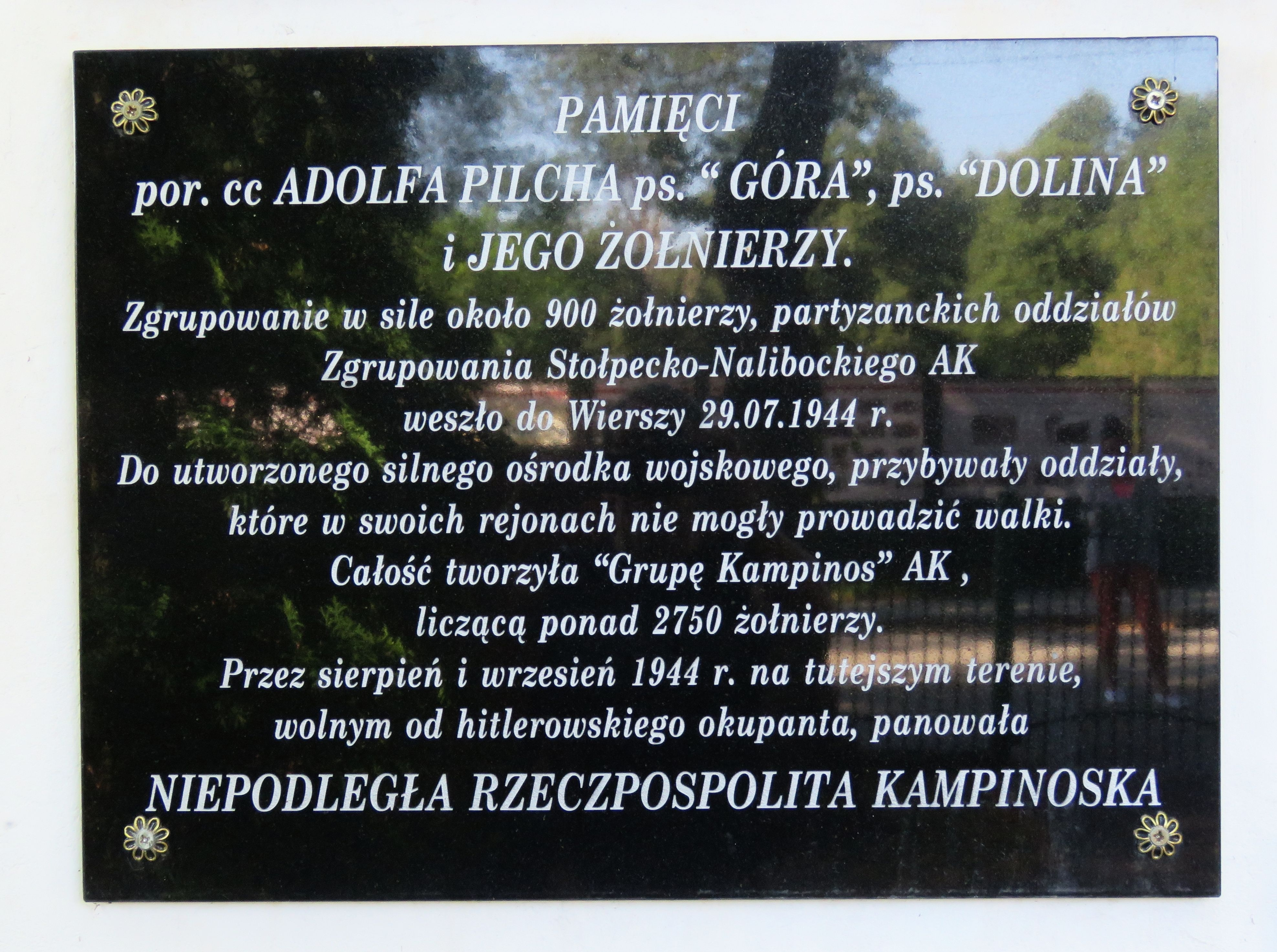
Commemorative plaque on the church in Wiersze honors the participation of the Stowbtsy-Naliboki Group in the battles within the Kampinos Forest

On the night between 25 and 26 July 1944, (Note: In his memoirs published in the early 1960s, Krzyczkowski (1962, p. 161) noted that the Góra's group stood in Dziekanów Polski on 24 July 1944, but this is an obvious mistake.) Captain Szymon received news that a several-hundred-strong unit, whose soldiers wore uniforms of the pre-war Polish Army and spoke Polish with an eastern accent, had stopped in Dziekanów Polski. The next day, the commander of the VIII District went to Dziekanów to assess the situation personally. Upon arrival, it was found that the leader of the newly arrived unit, Lieutenant Adolf Pilch, codenamed Góra, had gone to Warsaw. His deputy, Lieutenant Franciszek Rybka, codenamed Kula, informed Szymon that the Stowbtsy-Naliboki Group of the Home Army had arrived from the Naliboki Forest in the Eastern Borderlands.

The Stowbtsy-Naliboki Group was formed based on the Polish Partisan Unit named after Tadeusz Kościuszko, established in June 1943 in the Stowbtsy District of the Nowogródek Voivodeship. In its initial months, the unit engaged in intense fighting with the Germans, cooperating with Soviet partisans. However, the situation drastically changed in December 1943 when Soviet partisans deceitfully abducted the Polish group's command and then began disarming and liquidating subunits without officers. The new commander, Lieutenant Góra (a Silent Unseen paratrooper), seeking to save the remnants of the unit and protect the Polish population from Soviet partisan terror, decided, with the consent of the Nowogródek Home Army command, to make a temporary truce with the Germans. This decision allowed Góra to rebuild the group and continue fighting the Soviets.

In the summer of 1944, the rapid Soviet advance prevented the Stowbtsy-Naliboki Group from joining the main district forces and participating in the Operation Ostra Brama. Losing contact with the command, Lieutenant Góra decided to evacuate his unit to central Poland, effectively breaking the truce with the Germans. On 29 June 1944, Góra's units – a battalion of infantry, a cavalry squadron, a heavy machine gun squadron, and rear services – marched out of the Naliboki Forest westward. During their month-long trek, the Stowbtsy-Naliboki Group, maneuvering between the shattered German units on the Eastern Front, traversed several hundred kilometers, crossing the Neman, Shchara, and Bug rivers. The climax of their raid occurred on July 25 when Góra's units, using a clever military ruse, crossed the heavily guarded German bridge over the Vistula at Nowy Dwór Mazowiecki without a fight. Ultimately, after midnight on July 26, with the knowledge and consent of the Germans, the group arrived in Dziekanów Polski.

During the raid, Lieutenant Góra unsuccessfully tried to establish contact with the Home Army command. His attempt to reach Warsaw on July 26 also failed. Conspiratorial circles received Góra and his soldiers with great suspicion, possibly fearing that the presence of a unit accused of collaborating with the Germans could hinder cooperation with the Red Army on the eve of the planned uprising. Initially, the Warsaw County Subdistrict command considered forcibly disarming the Stowbtsy-Naliboki Group or purchasing their weapons. On July 27, the Home Army Main Command, through Captain Szymon, ordered Lieutenant Góra to march to the Tuchola Forest in Gdańsk Pomerania, also stating that Góra would face a drumhead court-martial for collaborating with the Germans. This order, later described by Stanisław Podlewski as mad and insane, effectively condemned the group to destruction, as the Borderlands soldiers had no chance of traversing several hundred kilometers through German-controlled territory. In this situation, Lieutenant Pilch informed Captain Szymon that he could not execute the Home Army Main Command's order and proposed that his group be placed under Szymon's command instead.

Captain Szymon quickly endorsed this proposal. He shared Góra's view of the senselessness of marching to the Tuchola Forest and recognized that integrating the Stowbtsy-Naliboki Group would augment his forces with nearly 900 well-armed and battle-hardened partisans. (Note: The strength of the Stowbtsy-Naliboki Group as of 26 July 1944 was 861 officers, non-commissioned officers, and enlisted men. The armament included: 7 grenade launchers, 11 heavy machine guns, 41 light and medium machine guns, 43 ten-shot rifles, 53 submachine guns, 627 rifles, 137 pistols, 794 grenades, and 195,500 rounds of ammunition. Additionally, the group had 589 horses, 320 saddles, 185 wagons, and 8 tachankas (Koszada (2007, p. 28); Podgóreczny (2010, pp. 5–6); Pilch (2013, p. 180)).) This integration would shift the balance of power in the eastern Kampinos Forest, enabling the Łęgi District to fulfill its insurgent objectives. Captain Szymon contacted the Home Army Main Command again, suggesting the incorporation of Góra's units into the VIII District. Ultimately, the Home Army command accepted Szymon's proposal but stipulated that he assumed command of the Naliboki Group at his own risk.

=== Order of battle of the VIII District on the eve of the Warsaw Uprising ===
The incorporation of the Stowbtsy-Naliboki Group significantly increased the combat strength of the VIII District. According to Jerzy Koszada's calculations, on the eve of the Warsaw Uprising, the Kampinos-Naliboki units had 2,092 soldiers (32 officers, 294 non-commissioned officers, 1,480 enlisted men, and 286 women). (Note: Captain Krzyczkowski (1962, pp. 175–176) cited slightly different numbers in his memoirs. According to him, on the eve of the Warsaw Uprising, the VIII District had 1,949 soldiers (30 officers, 267 non-commissioned officers, 1,505 enlisted men, and 147 women). Krzyczkowski's information on the armament of the VIII District units also differs slightly from Jerzy Koszada's findings.) The size and organizational structure of the VIII District units were as follows:

- District Command (4 officers, 14 non-commissioned officers, 15 enlisted men, 43 women)
- Quartermaster and medical services (6 officers, 10 non-commissioned officers, 20 enlisted men, 80 women)
- I Battalion (Lieutenant Janusz Langner, codenamed Janusz)
  - Command (1 officer, 5 non-commissioned officers, 10 enlisted men, 4 women)
  - 1st Company under Lieutenant Zygmunt Sokołowski, codenamed Zetes (1 officer, 12 non-commissioned officers, 160 enlisted men)
  - 3rd Company under Captain Ignacy Jezierski, codenamed Karaś (2 officers, 40 non-commissioned officers, 125 enlisted men)
  - 5th Company under Lieutenant Henryk Dobak, codenamed Olsza (1 officer, 13 non-commissioned officers, 110 enlisted men)
  - Assault Company under 2nd Lieutenant Józef Snarski, codenamed Czarny (1 officer, 10 non-commissioned officers, 60 enlisted men)
- II Battalion (Captain Stanisław Nowosad, codenamed Dulka)
  - Command (3 officers, 2 non-commissioned officers, 5 enlisted men, 3 women)
  - 2nd Company under Lieutenant Zbigniew Luśniak, codenamed Gniew (1 officer, 18 non-commissioned officers, 150 enlisted men)
  - 4th Company under Lieutenant Bolesław Kiełbasa, codenamed Gniewosz (1 officer, 20 non-commissioned officers, 157 enlisted men)
- Battalion of the 78th Infantry Regiment of Słuck (Lieutenant Witold Pełczyński, codenamed Dźwig) (Note: In this listing, the officers of the former Stowbtsy-Naliboki Group are identified by the pseudonyms they used until 3 August 1944. However, with the formation of the Palmiry-Młociny Regiment, some of them adopted new pseudonyms. Thus, Lieutenant Góra became known as Dolina, Lieutenant Dźwig as Witold, Ensign Noc as Nieczaj, Sergeant Major Dąb as Wołodyjowski, and Sergeant Major Szary as Lawina. Under these latter pseudonyms, they are most often referred to in the literature on the Warsaw Uprising (Podgóreczny (2010, p. 42)).)
  - Command (2 officers)
  - 1st Company under Lieutenant Franciszek Baumgart, codenamed Dan (2 officers, 26 non-commissioned officers, 112 enlisted men, 1 woman)
  - 2nd Company under Lieutenant Witold Lenczewski, codenamed Strzała (2 officers, 18 non-commissioned officers, 127 enlisted men, 4 women)
  - 3rd Company under Lieutenant Jerzy Piestrzyński, codenamed Helski (1 officer, 11 non-commissioned officers, 125 enlisted men)
- I Squadron of the 27th Uhlan Regiment (Warrant Officer Zdzisław Nurkiewicz, codenamed Noc)
  - Command (1 officer, 2 women)
  - 1st Squadron under Warrant Officer Jan Jakubowski, codenamed Dąb (18 non-commissioned officers, 59 enlisted men, 1 woman)
  - 2nd Squadron under Warrant Officer Józef Niedźwiecki, codenamed Szary (20 non-commissioned officers, 72 enlisted men, 2 women)
  - 3rd Squadron under Warrant Officer Cadet Narcyz Kulikowski, codenamed Sum (9 non-commissioned officers, 62 enlisted men)
  - 4th Squadron under 2nd Lieutenant Aleksander Pietrucki, codenamed Jawor (1 officer, 9 non-commissioned officers, 21 enlisted men, 6 women)
- Machine Gun Squadron under Lieutenant Jarosław Gąsiewski, codenamed Jar, forming the nucleus of the 23rd Grodno Uhlan Regiment (1 officer, 14 non-commissioned officers, 51 enlisted men, 1 woman)
- Military Uprising Protection Service Company under Eugeniusz Wyszomirski, codenamed Świt (25 non-commissioned officers, 39 enlisted men)
- Women's Military Service under Lieutenant Zofia Roesler, codenamed Polka (1 officer, 139 women).

The armament of the VIII District units included: 7 grenade launchers, 13 medium machine guns, 47 light machine guns, 61 submachine guns, 1,046 rifles, 175 pistols, 1,044 grenades, 367 Molotov cocktails, and 239,000 rounds of ammunition. In practice, only the I Battalion and the Naliboki units were fully armed, while the II Battalion served as a reserve unit. During one of the last briefings before the uprising, the commander of the Warsaw County Subdistrict, Major Kazimierz Krzyżak, codenamed Bronisław, ordered that at "W" Hour, unarmed soldiers should be equipped with grenades, Molotov cocktails, and even crowbars and pickaxes – and thus armed, thrown into battle. However, Captain Szymon and other district commanders ignored these instructions.

=== Beginning of the fighting in Kampinos Forest ===
After taking command of Góra's group, Captain Szymon decided that depending on the further actions of the Germans, the Naliboki soldiers would either immediately engage in combat or remain on standby. It was simultaneously decided to send a group of cavalrymen to Modlin, to exploit the enemy's belief that they were dealing with a collaborationist unit, in order to obtain as much ammunition, medicine, and bandages from the fortress garrison as possible. This ruse was partially successful. The Germans did indeed supply Góra's soldiers with a considerable amount of supplies, but as the Polish unit was leaving Modlin, the deception was discovered. A skirmish ensued, resulting in the death of one Polish lancer. Consequently, on July 29, Captain Szymon ordered the Naliboki group to leave Dziekanów and move to the area around the villages of Wiersze and Truskawka in the central part of Kampinos Forest. Along the way, Góra's soldiers were to eliminate German gendarmerie and border guard posts.

Around the same time (July 28), Szymon decided to mobilize part of the Kampinos subunits of the VIII District. The designated platoons began gathering in the Opaleń forest between Wólka Węglowa and Laski, reinforcing the 60-man partisan unit led by Lieutenant Józef Snarski, codenamed Czarny, which had been stationed there for several days. Captain Szymon chose a hunting lodge in Opaleń as his headquarters, while Lieutenant Janusz, commanding the 1st Battalion, settled with his company commanders in the Krupski villa in the Michałówka enclave. On July 30, Szymon mobilized another company commanded by Captain Ignacy Jezierski, codenamed Karaś, which stationed itself in the village of Janówek with the task of securing and observing the Naliboki units from the east.

On July 29, partisans stationed in the Opaleń forest skirmished with a patrol of German signalmen, which escalated into a clash with a Wehrmacht platoon sent for reinforcement. The Germans retreated after a half-hour battle. In other areas, VIII District soldiers also began eliminating individual enemy soldiers or small subunits, killing several Germans and their Eastern collaborators, and capturing some weapons. Meanwhile, the soldiers of Góra en route to Wiersze eliminated the German gendarmerie and border guard posts in Kaliszki. The most significant clash occurred in Aleksandrów, where on the morning of July 31, the Naliboki units completely defeated a Wehrmacht company, killing nearly 50 Germans and capturing a substantial amount of weapons and ammunition. Five prisoners were taken, who, after being disarmed and stripped of their uniforms, were released. Their own losses were limited to one killed and two wounded (according to Marian Podgóreczny, none of the Polish soldiers were killed).

According to Józef Krzyczkowski, the arrival of nearly 900 soldiers of the Stowbtsy-Naliboki Group in Dziekanów, the partial mobilization of the VIII District units, and the clashes in the Opaleń forest and Aleksandrów effectively marked the beginning of the uprising in Kampinos Forest.

== First assault on the Bielany airfield ==
=== Operations of the Kampinos units ===
Early on the morning of August 1st, a group of soldiers from the VIII District was sent to Łomianki and Młociny with the task of organizing a supply of provisions for Lieutenant Góra's units. Around noon, as the four-wagon convoy was returning, Polish soldiers got into a skirmish with Germans quartered in Wólka Węglowa. A detachment led by Lieutenant Czarny went to the convoy's aid, and under its cover, the wagons and soldiers managed to withdraw from the village. The enemy also received reinforcements, leading to a regular battle in the Wólka Węglowa area. The Germans did not dare to enter the Opaleń forest and confined themselves to shelling it with artillery and heavy infantry weapons. The clash resulted in two Home Army soldiers being wounded, one fatally. German casualties were reported to be three killed and five wounded.

Around 3 PM, while the battle at Wólka Węglowa was still ongoing, the courier Krysia (identity unknown) arrived at Captain Szymon's headquarters in Opaleń, informing him that the uprising was set to begin at 5 PM. Receiving the order so late put Szymon in a very difficult position. Only Lieutenant Janusz's battalion, which was only partially mobilized, was ready to act immediately. The Naliboki group along with Captain Karaś' company were in the Wiersze and Janówek area, about 15–18 km from the concentration points of hills 93, 103, and 96 at Łuże, where the VIII District was supposed to assemble. The rest of the units were scattered or still not mobilized. There was no way that the entirety of the VIII District's forces could concentrate at Łuże and strike the Bielany airfield within the two-hour deadline.

Szymon faced a tough decision. He could attack the airfield with the few units on hand or break the Home Army command's order and delay the assault until the entire VIII District's forces could be concentrated. The airfield garrison was estimated by Home Army intelligence to be about 700 soldiers, so it was clear that an attack with only Janusz's battalion had little chance of success and could only serve to distract the enemy. After brief consideration, Szymon decided to proceed with the attack at the designated time. He understood that the attack on the Bielany airfield would be part of a larger uprising, and he did not want to risk the Kampinos units' inactivity allowing the Germans to concentrate all their forces against the Żoliborz Subdistrict's units. Nevertheless, he ordered an immediate concentration of all VIII District forces in the area of Hill 103 at Łuże, while instructing Lieutenant Góra to dispatch a cavalry squadron to block the Warsaw–Modlin road at Pieńków. He also ordered the cessation of fighting at Wólka Węglowa, leaving only a small security detachment with an LMG from Czarny's unit.

Lieutenant Janusz, who was to lead the first assault on the airfield, had at his disposal two platoons from Lieutenant Czarny's storm company, two platoons from the 1st Company led by Lieutenant Zetes, and two platoons from the 5th Company led by Lieutenant Olsza. These totaled about 190 soldiers, armed with 2 heavy machine guns, 2 light machine guns, rifles, and grenades. The attack plan called for the units to pass through Opaleń, Zwierzyniec, and Łuże, and then move to positions at the northern edge of the forest near Wólka Węglowa. From there, under cover of bushes and thickets, the battalion was to approach as close as possible to the enemy positions in the Placówka area and then attack the airfield from the northwest. The units departed from the Michałówka enclave around 4 PM. Lieutenant Czarny joined the main force in Opaleń with his two platoons. The Polish subunits moved quickly, with Ensign Zbigniew Peryński's platoon leading the way. As they moved through the eastern part of the Opaleń forest, they came under fire from German artillery positioned near the airfield and Boernerowo. This fire was not intense and caused no casualties.

Upon reaching their starting positions, Janusz's battalion emerged into the open and deployed in a skirmish line. On the left flank were Czarny's platoons, in the center was Olsza's unit, while Zetes' platoons held the right flank, tasked with protecting the attack from Wólka Węglowa. As they moved through a densely wooded area, confusion spread in the Polish formation, preventing Zetes's platoons from leaving the woods. The remaining four platoons began the assault at 5 PM. Advancing in long bounds, they soon approached the German forward positions. There, they were ordered to open fire. Initially, the fight went well for the Poles, as the surprised Germans began to abandon their positions, suffering casualties.

The enemy quickly recovered, and several silent defensive positions erupted with heavy fire, pinning down the right flank of the assault. The left flank managed to advance another 300 m before also being pinned down by machine gun fire. Despite attempts, the Polish officers could not spur the soldiers to resume the attack. They then tried to engage the enemy positions with fire. German fire killed the crew of one of the Polish heavy machine guns, but a machine gunner named Guzowski managed to retrieve the valuable weapon from the front line at great personal risk. The fierce firefight continued for several minutes. With ammunition running low, casualties mounting, and no chance of breaking the German defense, the Home Army soldiers were soon forced to retreat. Olsza's unit was the first to withdraw to the forest without Janusz's authorization. Believing that the task of engaging the German forces had been accomplished, Janusz ordered a return to the Hill 103 area, where his battalion was to secure the concentration of the main VIII District forces.

The battle lasted about two hours in total. The Polish battalion lost 5 killed and 12 wounded. According to Captain Szymon, German casualties were reported to be 6 killed and 10 wounded.

=== Actions of the Żoliborz units ===
Around 2:00 PM in Żoliborz, a patrol of German gendarmes engaged in a skirmish with soldiers from the Żniwiarz Group, who were transporting weapons from a covert warehouse. Soon after, regular fighting broke out in the district. The premature outbreak of the uprising had a very negative impact on the preparations for the uprising in Żoliborz. The element of surprise was lost, the communications system of District II was paralyzed, and the entire area was quickly cut off from the rest of the city. In the ensuing chaos, many soldiers did not manage to reach their rally points on time, and some of the weapons and ammunition did not make it there either. The negative consequences of the premature outbreak also affected the III Region. The units from Bielany were cut off from the main forces of District II, and many soldiers did not make it to their rally points on time. Worse still, the company commanded by Second Lieutenant Kwarciany was completely cut off in Marymont (Note: Approximately two hours before the planned start of the uprising, Second Lieutenant Kwarciany's company set out to aid the soldiers of the 4th Battalion of the Military Units of the Uprising Emergency of Socialists, who had been surprised by the Germans at the assembly point in the VI Warsaw Housing Cooperative Colony on Suzina Street. As a result of the ensuing fight, Kwarciany's soldiers repelled the German attack from the direction of Waldlager and the Gas School at 6 Gdańska Street. However, the company was cut off from the main forces of the III Region and remained in Marymont (Jasiński (2009, pp. 132–133, 145)).) and did not participate in the assault on Waldlager and the church. Ultimately, at the "W" Hour, only 400 soldiers from the III Region went into battle.

Under these circumstances, the Polish assault ended in complete failure. The companies of Second Lieutenant Brzoza and Lieutenant Ojciec Marian, attacking the university, were pinned down by heavy mortar and machine gun fire. Some soldiers managed to cross to the other side of Marymoncka Street, but none managed to breach the university fence. The Polish units suffered heavy losses in this assault, with Second Lieutenant Brzoza and Cadet Henryk Kokoszkiewicz, codenamed Lubicz (deputy commander of the 214th platoon), among the fallen. A few dozen minutes after the first attack collapsed, Polish soldiers resumed the assault, but they were again repelled, suffering heavy losses. The actions of Lieutenant Starża’s company, which attacked Waldlager with all its forces contrary to the original plans, also ended in failure. Shortly after leaving their starting positions on Podleśna Street, the 212th platoon, attacking in open terrain, was pinned down by heavy machine gun fire from the university and Waldlager. The neighboring 237th and 239th platoons managed to reach the edge of Bielany Forest, but were pinned down there by intense enemy fire. After a few minutes, the Polish soldiers began to retreat. A subsequent attempt to resume the assault also failed. In this situation, Lieutenant Starża was forced to withdraw his company to the starting positions.

The repulse of the Kampinos units' assault enabled the Germans to launch a counterattack against Captain Serb's units fighting in Bielany. Around 7:30 PM, an infantry attack supported by armored weapons began from the airfield area and Wawrzyszew. The Germans attacked in the general direction of the university complex. Initially, the main burden of the assault was borne by the engineer platoon commanded by Second Lieutenant Władysław Czerny, codenamed Olszyna. The Polish soldiers managed to disable several German vehicles with grenades and explosives, but they suffered heavy losses (among the fallen was Second Lieutenant Olszyna). The sacrifice of the engineers, however, gave Captain Serb time to regroup his forces and prepare for defense. The Germans, not knowing the exact positions of the Polish defenses, did not risk a night attack.

The uprising in Żoliborz ended in almost complete failure. The units of District II did not capture any of their key objectives, suffering heavy losses in manpower and equipment. The district's staff lost contact with the command of the Warsaw District of the Home Army. In this situation, around 10:00 PM on August 1, Lieutenant Colonel Mieczysław Niedzielski, codenamed Żywiciel, yielding to the persuasion of his officers, decided to withdraw the Żoliborz Subdistrict units to the Kampinos Forest. The withdrawal from Warsaw took place at 2:30 AM. Meanwhile, a few hours earlier, around 10:30 PM, units of the III Region left the city on their own initiative. The march of Lieutenant Starża's company ended tragically, as Captain Serb's orders reached them only after midnight. Unable to join the concentration of III Region units and not knowing the withdrawal route designated by Serb, Starża's company was forced to set out independently. On August 2, shortly before dawn, the Polish unit was surprised and destroyed by the Germans near Boernerowo. At least 73 Home Army soldiers were killed in the unequal fight.

== Second assault on the Bielany airfield ==
=== Preparations ===
For most of the night of August 1st to 2nd, the main forces of the VIII Region gathered in the area around Hill 103 on Łuże. The "old" Kampinos units completed their concentration first, around 1:00 AM. Captain Szymon instructed that all well-armed soldiers be assigned to Lieutenant Janusz's I Battalion, while unarmed or poorly armed soldiers were sent to Captain Dulka's reserve battalion. Around 2:30 AM, after a strenuous march through a rainy night, Lieutenant Góra and the majority of the Stowbtsy-Naliboki Group's subunits also arrived at the assembly point. After the concentration was completed, Szymon gave a speech to the soldiers, reminding them of the German atrocities against the Polish nation committed in nearby Palmiry and on the Łuże Hill, and emphasized that capturing the Bielany airfield would allow the insurgents to receive Allied air support for Warsaw. Moments later, the designated assault units set out towards the airfield. After marching from 1.5 to 2 km, a short rest was ordered, and the last officers' briefing before the battle was convened. The assault was scheduled to begin at 3:30 AM.

A total of 984 officers and soldiers were to take part in the direct assault on the airfield. According to Szymon's attack plan, the main burden of the fight was to be borne by two infantry battalions – the Kampinos battalion under Lieutenant Janusz and the Naliboki battalion under Lieutenant Dźwig – additionally supported by a heavy machine gun squadron under Lieutenant Jar. They were to break through the gap between the German positions in Młociny and Placówka, then strike the airfield from the north. The left wing of the assault was to be formed by three companies from Janusz's battalion, tasked with capturing the so-called Siberian Forest near Młociny (now the Dęby Młocińskie reserve) and then continuing the assault towards Horstlager. The right wing of the assault consisted of companies under Lieutenants Strzała and Helski from Dźwig's battalion, along with the dismounted heavy machine gun squadron, which were to attack generally towards hangar No. 2. Szymon kept Lieutenant Olsza's Kampinos company and Lieutenant Dan's Naliboki company (both equipped with anti-tank weapons) in reserve. They were to advance about 500 m behind the right wing. If the assault succeeded, Janusz's battalion was to secure the airfield from the Bielany and Wawrzyszew side, while one of Dźwig's Naliboki companies would organize the base's defense from the Młociny side. The remaining two Naliboki companies, along with the heavy machine gun squadron, would remain in the airfield area as a reserve.

While the main forces of the region stormed the Bielany airfield, the dismounted cavalry squadron was to block the Warsaw–Modlin road, thus covering the assault from the Modlin fortress side. The forward 3rd squadron under Warrant Officer Sum set up an ambush near Pieńków, while the lancers from the 1st and 4th squadrons under the general command of Sergeant Noc blocked the road between Młociny and Buraków. Captain Dulka's reserve battalion, numbering 392 soldiers, including only 20 armed ones, remained at Łuże to cover the concentration area.

While preparing the next assault on the Bielany airfield, Captain Szymon was unaware that the Żoliborz Subdistrict units had left Warsaw and were heading towards the Kampinos Forest. Around 5:00 AM, the marching Żoliborz insurgents heard the sounds of the battle being fought by the VIII Region's units. Upon reaching Sieraków, where the column stopped to rest, Lieutenant Colonel Żywiciel ordered the best-armed soldiers from each unit to go to the aid of Szymon's units. However, for unexplained reasons, this order was canceled before it could be carried out.

=== Course of the battle in the Bielany airfield area ===
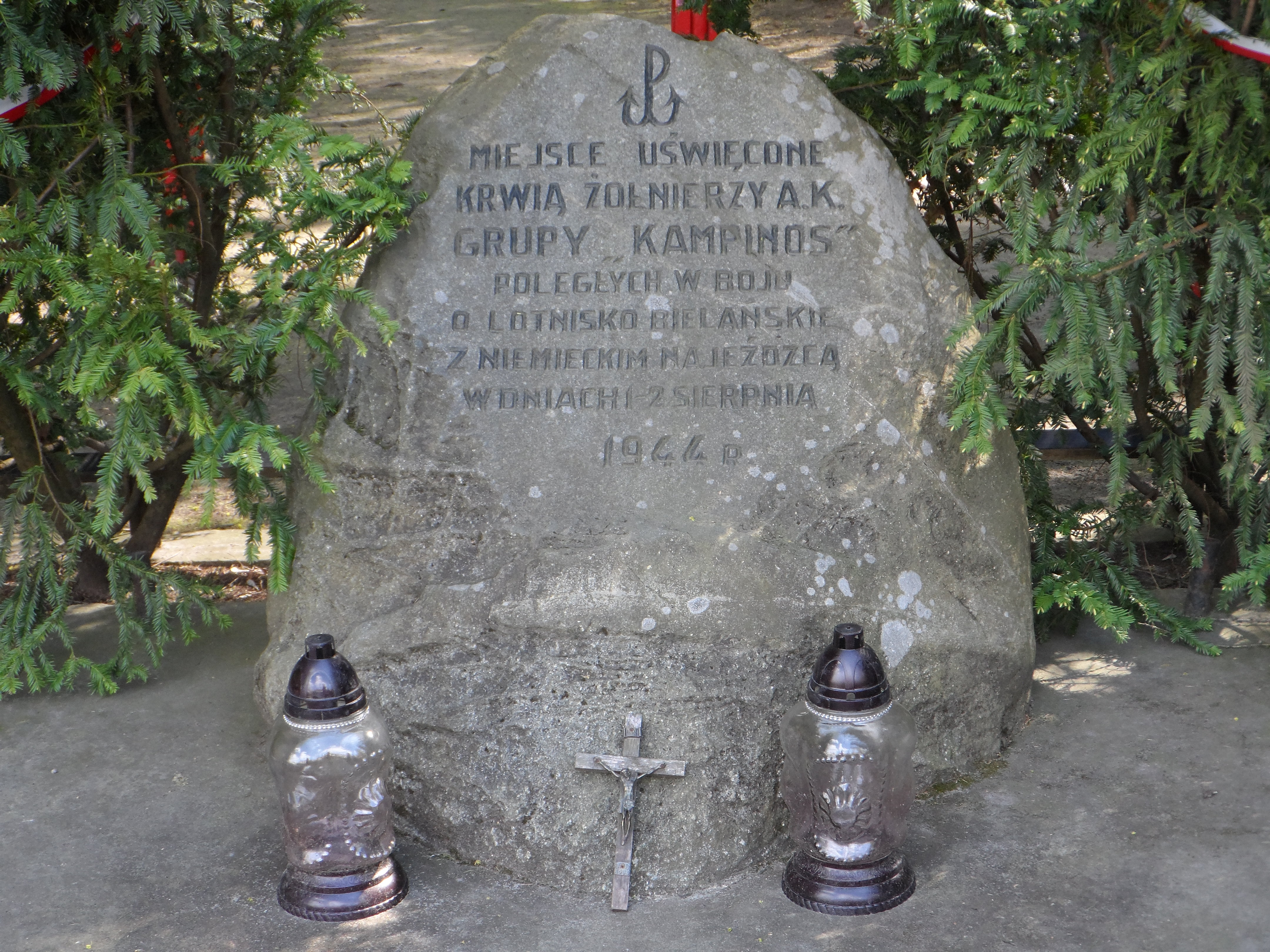
“Old” boulder at the memorial site on Michalina Street in Warsaw. Photo from 2015

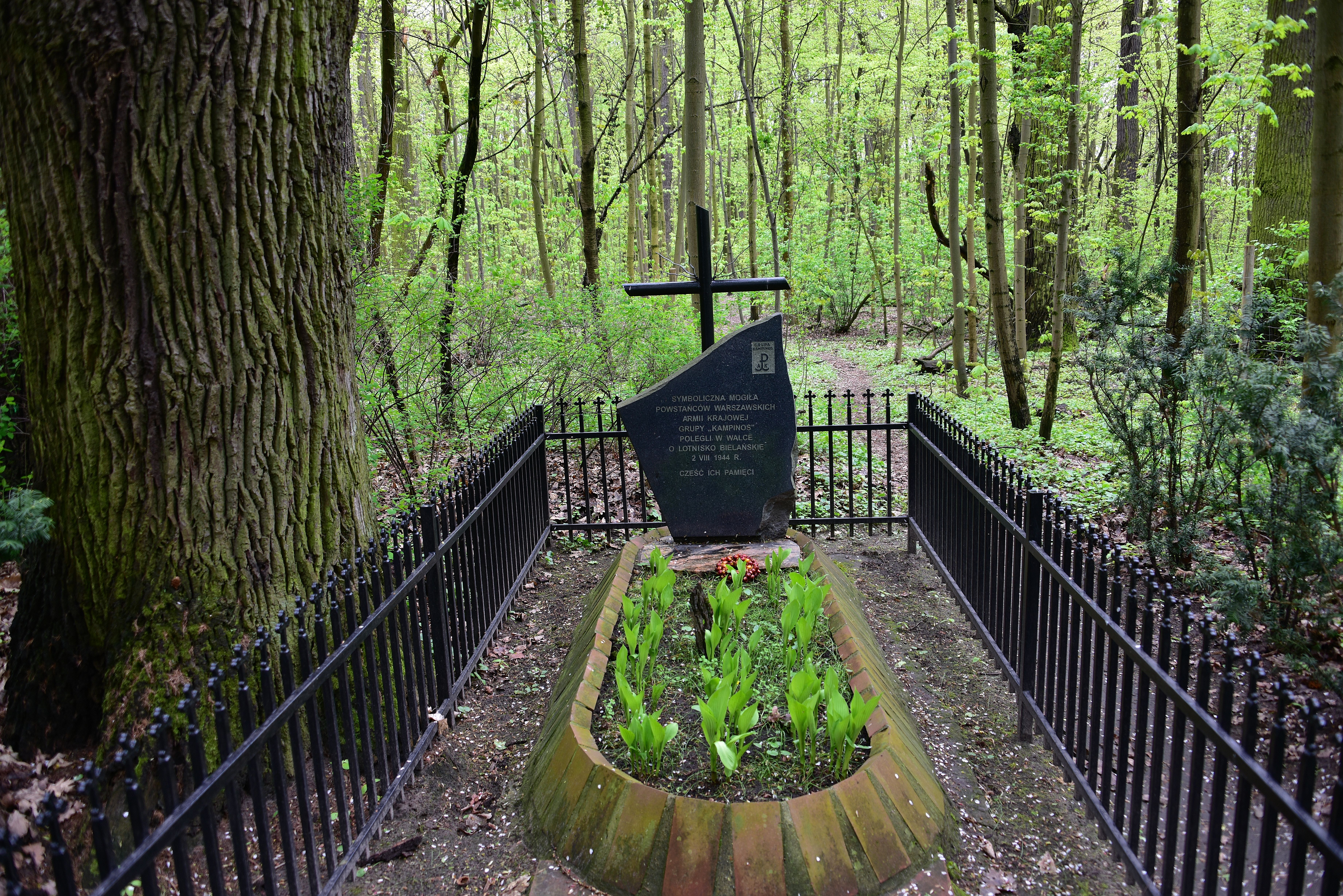
Symbolic grave of Home Army soldiers killed in the second attack on Bielany airfield in the Dęby Młocińskie reserve

Lieutenant Witold Lenczewski, codenamed Strzała, recalled that the Polish units' advance to their starting positions was delayed by at least half an hour for unknown reasons. Consequently, the assault began around 4:00 AM. On the right flank, where the open and obstacle-free terrain was disadvantageous to the attackers, the battle immediately took a negative turn for the Polish side. When the companies of Helski and Strzała were from 500 to 800 m from the enemy's combat positions, the fog lifted, and the rising sun exposed the attacking line. Alerted by previous skirmishes, the Germans were vigilant and not caught off guard. As a result, the Polish soldiers were quickly pinned down by the enemy's intense fire from cannons and machine guns. The most difficult situation was faced by Lieutenant Strzała's company, positioned furthest west, which bore the brunt of the German fire. (Note: Strzała's account differs in several details from Captain Krzyczkowski's. The latter claimed that, similar to the first assault, Polish soldiers managed to approach undetected to within about 100–150 m of the enemy positions. He also stated that on the right flank of the Naliboki battalion, it was Lieutenant Helski's 3rd company advancing, not Strzała's company (Podgóreczny (2010, p. 32); Krzyczkowski (1962, pp. 200–201, 204)).) Among the casualties was the company reconnaissance commander, Warrant Officer Mieczysław Dolecki, and the deputy company commander, Second Lieutenant Mikołaj Stecki, codenamed Nowina, who was seriously wounded.

With the assault halted, Szymon was forced to bring the Polish heavy machine guns and grenade launchers to the front line, tasked with engaging the enemy's resistance nests. However, due to poor visibility caused by thick drizzle and the effective camouflage of German positions, the Polish heavy machine guns could only provide inaccurate suppressive fire. Meanwhile, German artillery joined the fray. To make matters worse, a German armored car appeared in front of the Polish lines, bombarding the Home Army soldiers with intense fire. Lacking heavy weapons, the insurgents struggled to approach the vehicle within grenade or Molotov cocktail throwing range. Under the cover of heavy machine gun and grenade launcher fire, an attempt was made to resume the assault, but after nearly an hour of firefight, Dźwig's battalion managed to advance only 200 meters.

In this situation, Szymon decided to deploy the reserve company of Lieutenant Dan, instructing the soldiers to attempt to bypass the German armored car. The reserve company soon came under heavy fire from enemy cannons and machine guns. Despite the intense barrage, some Polish subunits began to advance slowly. While trying to rally the soldiers for another assault, Szymon was severely wounded in the leg. Shortly afterward, Lieutenant Helski was killed, and Lieutenant Gniew of the 2nd Kampinos company was seriously injured. Polish casualties were mounting, but Lieutenant Góra, who took over command of the fighting units in place of the wounded Szymon, did not halt the assault. The insurgents eventually managed to destroy the enemy armored car, which burned with its entire crew. (Note: According to an eyewitness account, the German armored car was destroyed by rifleman Jan Dzienis from Lieutenant Strzała's company. Allegedly, with his first shot from a grenade launcher, he directly hit the hatch, which the confident crew had supposedly left open. However, Nowak (2011, pp. 52–53) questions this version as too improbable. In his opinion, the enemy vehicle was hit by grenades or Molotov cocktails thrown by soldiers from either Strzała's or Helski's company (Podgóreczny (2010, p. 30); Podlewski (1979, p. 76)).) However, the Polish soldiers were unable to make a significant breakthrough in the German defense. Around 6:00 AM, as weather conditions improved, German fighters joined the battle, strafing Dźwig's soldiers, who were lying on open ground, from low altitude multiple times. The air assault did not cause significant losses or confusion among the Polish ranks, but the assault on this sector was definitively stalled.

Meanwhile, on the left flank, Janusz's battalion managed to approach the Siberia forest under the cover of thickets and bushes. The Polish units then spread out in a skirmish line, with Lieutenant Czarny's assault company on the right wing, Lieutenant Zetes' company in the center, and Captain Karaś' company on the left flank. The first two companies directly attacked the forest, while the left-wing unit advanced along the western edge of Młociny. A fierce battle soon ensued in the forest, with fighting for every meter of terrain and frequent close-quarters combat. The struggle was particularly intense over the farm buildings located deep in the forest, attacked by soldiers from Zetes' and Karaś' companies. The insurgents almost completely wiped out the manor's garrison, with the enemy only managing to hold out in the cellars. However, due to the inexperience of the Kampinos soldiers and the well-equipped German infantry armed with submachine guns, the battle in the forest soon turned unfavorable for the Polish side. Lieutenant Janusz was killed, and Lieutenant Czarny was seriously wounded. The Polish soldiers also began to run out of ammunition. Additionally, two German tanks arrived from the Modlin road, shelling the exposed 3rd company. Among the casualties were the company commander, Captain Karaś, Platoon Commander Sergeant Tomasz Miazga, codenamed Młot, and the crew of one of the heavy machine guns.

The fight on the right flank was still ongoing when Lieutenant Góra noticed two red flares fired by lancers from the Buraków area. This was the agreed-upon signal that German tanks were approaching from Modlin. Facing dwindling ammunition supplies, no prospects of breaking through the German defense, and the threat of a flank attack from the Modlin road, Góra ordered a retreat to the assembly point. The Germans did not pursue. Around the same time, the heavily battered I Battalion also began to withdraw, although their retreat was more difficult as they had to fall back under fire from tanks on the Modlin road. By around 11:00 AM (some sources indicate 9:00 AM), the VIII Region's units regrouped in the Łuże hills area.

The second attack on the Bielany airfield cost the VIII Region's units 31 dead and 45 wounded. (Note: Different sources provide slightly varying data on Polish casualties during the second assault on the Bielany airfield. According to Borkiewicz (1969, p. 79) and Kirchmayer (1984, p. 225), the VIII Rejon units suffered 29 killed and 45 wounded. Pilch (2013, p. 191), in his post-war memoirs, estimated Polish casualties at 29 killed and 49 wounded. Jasiński (2009, p. 62–63, 174), on the other hand, reported that nearly 50 Home Army soldiers were killed in the battle, with another 140 wounded. In contrast, a German report on the battle significantly exaggerated the numbers, claiming that 300 Polish insurgents were killed (and also reported the capture of 3 heavy machine guns, 1 light machine gun, and numerous rifles).) Among the fallen were I Battalion Commander Lieutenant Janusz and two company commanders (Captain Karaś and Lieutenant Helski). Wounded included Captain Szymon and Assault Company Commander Lieutenant Czarny. The heaviest losses, amounting to 22 killed and about 30 wounded, were suffered by Lieutenant Janusz's Kampinos battalion. The Naliboki units lost 9 killed and missing, and several wounded. Captain Szymon estimated German losses at 20 killed and 30 wounded, though these numbers are unverifiable. Lieutenant Góra estimated the number of German dead at a dozen or so.

=== Battle of the Uhlans on the Modlin road ===
Around 2:00 AM, before the assault on the Bielany airfield began, a squadron of Uhlans led by Corporal Sum blocked the Modlin road near Pieńków. Before dawn, they stopped a passing car, killing its five occupants – the driver, an officer with the rank of captain, and three civilian Germans. Later, in daylight, a German convoy of trucks coming from Modlin fell into the Polish ambush. The Uhlans destroyed 12 vehicles, killed 28 Schutzstaffel and Wehrmacht soldiers (other sources state 26 Germans were killed), and captured 16 rifles, 3 submachine guns, and a lot of ammunition. Their own losses were minimal, with one dead and two wounded. Around 10:00 AM, a lone German armored car approached from Modlin but retreated after being fired upon by the Uhlans. Shortly thereafter, German tanks appeared, forcing the cavalrymen, lacking anti-tank weapons, to retreat.

Initially, the actions of the 1st and 4th squadrons were also successful. On the stretch between Buraków and Młociny, the Uhlans destroyed four enemy vehicles and killed eight Germans without suffering any losses. However, soon after, a German motorized infantry unit followed by tanks approached from Modlin. After a brief skirmish, the Uhlans fired the agreed-upon rocket signals, warning the main forces of the VIII Region of the threat from Modlin, and then commenced their withdrawal.

=== Aftermath ===
Following the failed attack on the airfield, the VIII Region units retreated into the Kampinos Forest, towards the villages of Wiersze, Truskawka, Janówek, and Krogulec. On August 3rd, near Truskawka, the Polish group surprised and completely defeated a strong German unit. Suffering their own losses of 7 killed and 10 wounded, they killed nearly 70 Germans and took several more prisoners. This victory significantly boosted morale among the group. On the same day, the Palmiry-Młociny Regiment was formed from the Naliboki units and the "native" VIII Region units. The injured Szymon handed over direct command of the units in combat to Lieutenant Góra, while retaining overall leadership. Soon, units from other regions and districts of the Warsaw District, as well as from the neighboring Western Subdistrict, began arriving in the Kampinos Forest, forming the Kampinos Group.

== Summary ==
The first assault on the Bielany airfield was purely demonstrative in nature. However, looking back, some historians and veterans believe that the second assault was also doomed to failure from the start. The original plans for a two-pronged attack on the airfield were not realized, and the defeat of the Żoliborz Subdistrict units at "W" Hour allowed the Germans to concentrate the majority of their forces against the VIII Region units. It is likely that the second assault would have ended in failure even with the hypothetical involvement of the Żoliborz units, as the airfield garrison was too numerous and well-armed, and previous attacks by Kampinos and Żoliborz units had deprived the Polish side of the element of surprise.

Regardless, some veterans believed that the failure of the second assault was also due to errors made by Captain Szymon. Witold Lenczewski believed that, given the enemy's fire superiority, the VIII Region commander should not have thrown all his forces into an attack in one direction, especially in the light of the rising sun. He argued that the enemy's positions should have been thoroughly scouted first, followed by a nighttime attack from multiple directions. Edward Bonarowski quoted participants in the assault who claimed that Szymon had incorrectly deployed the units on the battlefield (especially the reserve companies) and had made a mistake by leaving all the anti-tank weapons with the second-line units.

The consequences of the Polish defeat were severe. The draft report on the activities of the German 6th Air Fleet (Luftflotte 6) stated that holding the airfields at Okęcie and Bielany had a decisive impact on the course of the Warsaw Uprising. The Germans' hold on positions around the airfield certainly prevented the establishment of a permanent connection between the insurgent Żoliborz and the later "Independent Republic of Kampinos". Additionally, both attacks resulted in significant losses in personnel and equipment for the VIII Region units, and they expended a substantial portion of their ammunition reserves. The defeat also temporarily lowered morale within the VIII Region ranks. Some unarmed Kampinos reservists returned home, and trust in the "Warsaw command" decreased among the Naliboki units. Consequently, the Home Army group in the Kampinos Forest remained incapable of conducting major offensive operations until mid-August 1944.

Meanwhile, on August 8, the German command issued orders to prepare for the destruction of the Bielany airfield. By August 16, the runway had been completely plowed up and 60% secured against a potential parachute landing (using mines and other obstacles). The Germans also destroyed the base's infrastructure. Some Polish veterans were convinced that the Polish attacks had prompted the Germans to abandon the use of the airfield. For this reason, Jacek Sawicki concluded that at "W" Hour, the VIII Region achieved the greatest success among all the districts of the Warsaw County Subdistrict.

== Commemoration ==
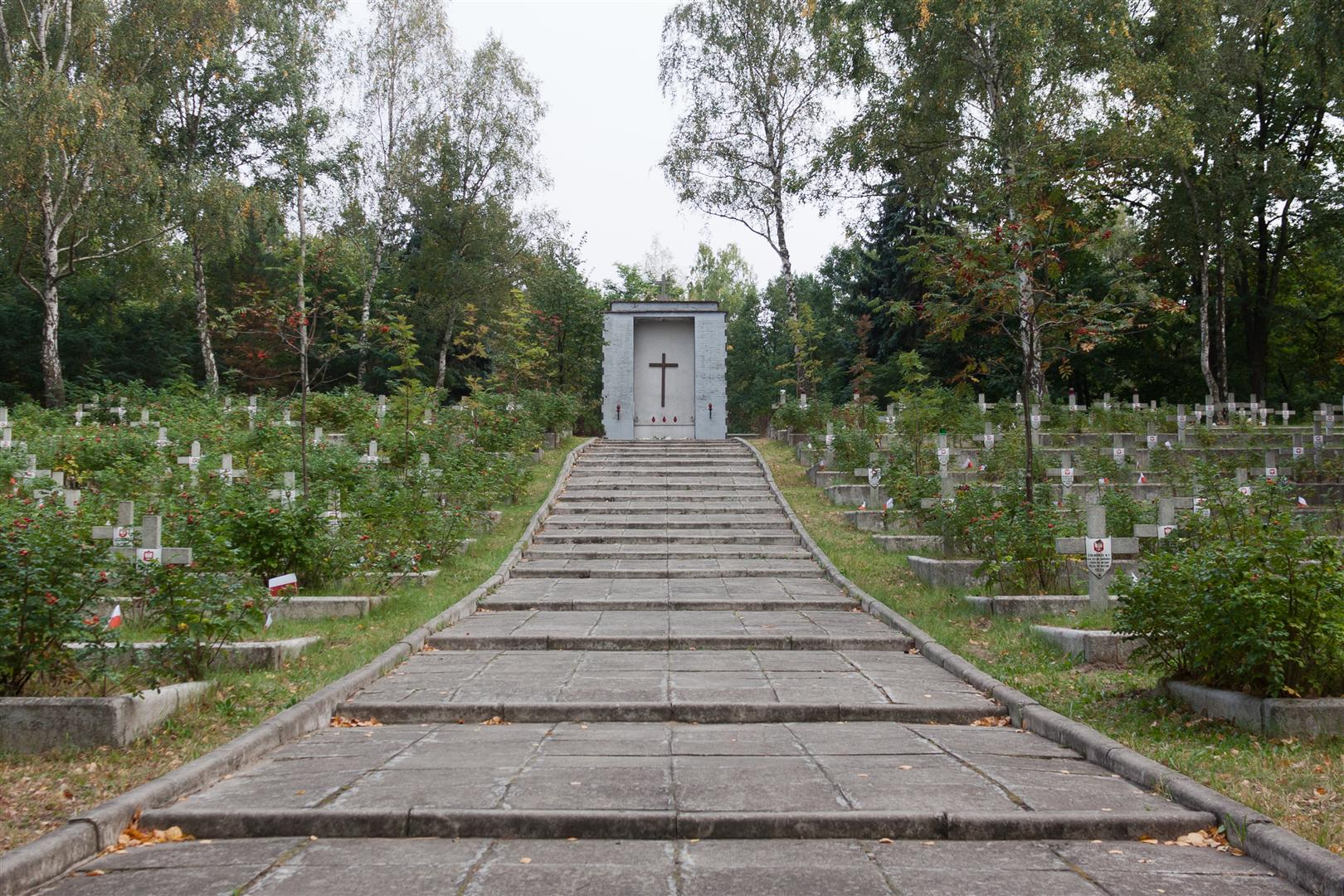
War cemetery in Laski, where the remains of several hundred soldiers who fell in September 1939 rest alongside those of Home Army soldiers who died in assaults on the Bielany airfield

In the early years of the Polish People's Republic, efforts to commemorate the armed deeds of the Kampinos Group faced numerous obstacles from the communist authorities. Nevertheless, the veteran community centered around Captain Józef Krzyczkowski, codenamed Szymon, quickly developed energetic activities. One of their first initiatives was to ensure a dignified burial for the soldiers who died in the assaults on the Bielany airfield. Initially, they secured the provisional graves and then moved the remains of the fallen to the war cemetery in Laski.

In the 1970s, a concrete slab commemorating the Home Army soldiers who fell in the assaults on the Bielany airfield was installed on the edge of the Dęby Młocińskie reserve, opposite house number 10 on Michalina Street in Warsaw. In 1994, the memorial site was supplemented with a commemorative stone. In 2015, a new monument in the form of a slab and obelisk was unveiled there. It bears the Kotwica symbol and the following inscription:

This place is hallowed by the blood of Home Army soldiers of the Kampinos Group who fell in battle for the Bielany airfield against the German invader between 1 and 2 August 1944. Glory to the heroes.

Behind the monument, several meters deeper into the forest, there is also a symbolic grave of Home Army soldiers who fell on 2 August 1944.

== Bibliography ==
- Bonarowski, Edward (2014). Burza nad Dworcem Gdańskim. W bój – bez broni (in Polish). Kraków: Mireki. ISBN 978-83-64452-09-3.
- Borkiewicz, Adam (1969). Powstanie warszawskie. Zarys działań natury wojskowej (in Polish). Warsaw: Pax.
- Jasiński, Grzegorz (2009). Żoliborz 1944 (in Polish). Pruszków: Ajaks. ISBN 978-83-62046-03-4.
- Kirchmayer, Jerzy (1984). Powstanie Warszawskie (in Polish). Warsaw: Książka i Wiedza. ISBN 83-05-11-080-X.
- Koszada, Jerzy (2007). "Grupa Kampinos". Partyzanckie zgrupowanie Armii Krajowej walczące w Powstaniu Warszawskim (in Polish). Warsaw: ZP GRUPA Sp. z o.o. ISBN 978-83-925916-6-5.
- Krzyczkowski, Józef (1962). Konspiracja i powstanie w Kampinosie (in Polish). Warsaw: Ludowa Spółdzielnia Wydawnicza.
- Nowak, Szymon (2011). Puszcza Kampinoska – Jaktorów 1944 (in Polish). Warsaw: Bellona. ISBN 978-83-11-12141-6.
- Pilch, Adolf (2013). Partyzanci trzech puszcz (in Polish). Kraków: Mireki. ISBN 978-83-89533-92-0.
- Podgóreczny, Marian (2010). Doliniacy. Niepodległa Rzeczpospolita Kampinoska (in Polish). Vol. II. Warsaw: BMT ERIDIA. ISBN 978-83-930539-3-3.
- Podlewski, Stanisław (1979). Rapsodia żoliborska (in Polish). Warsaw: Pax. ISBN 83-211-0009-0.
- Sawicki, Jacek Zygmunt (2002). "Obroża" w konspiracji i Powstaniu Warszawskim. Dzieje Armii Krajowej na przedpolu Warszawy (in Polish). Warsaw: Bellona. ISBN 83-11-09407-1.
