= Łomna, Gmina Czosnów =

Łomna
- Village
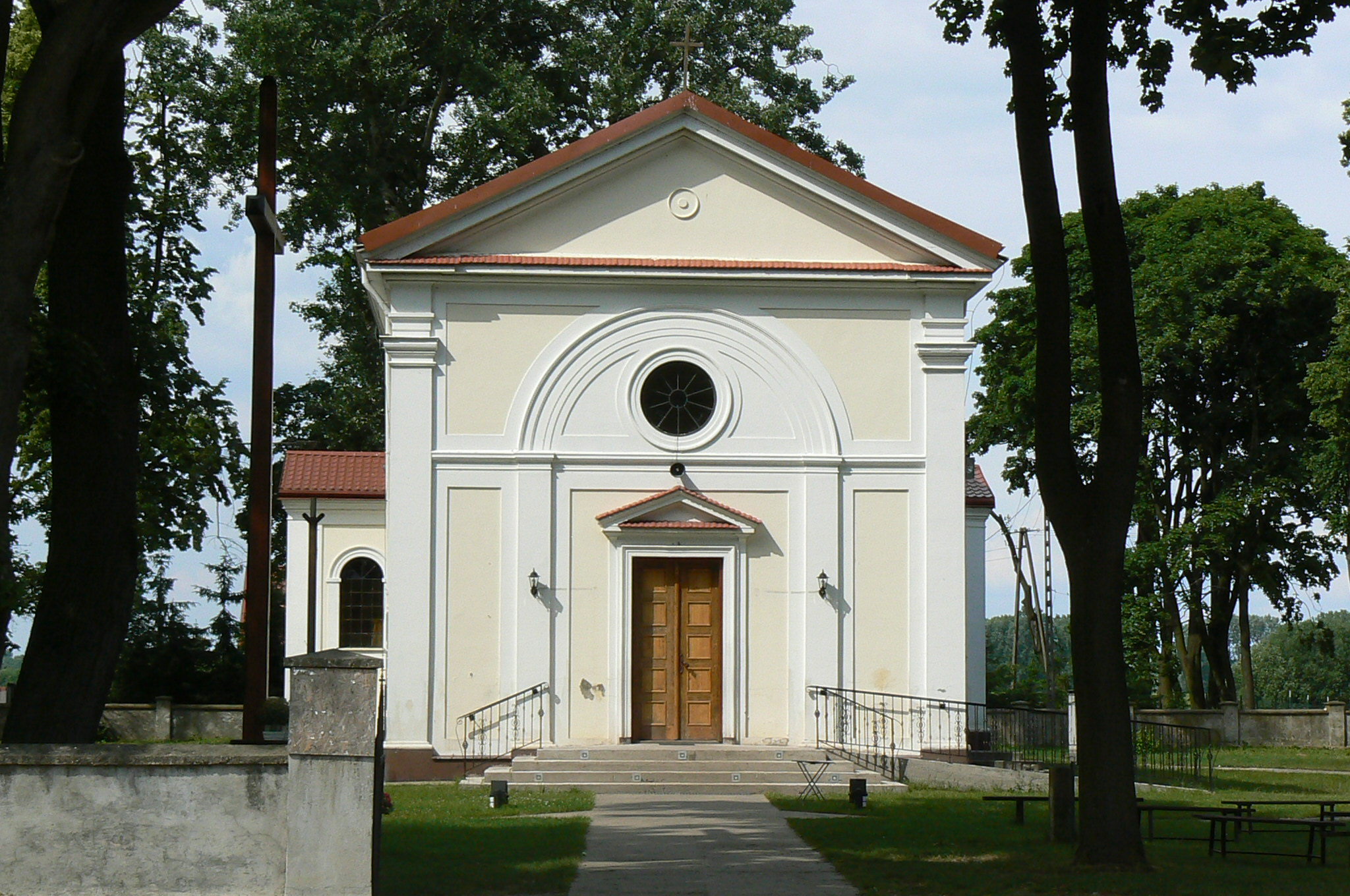
- Saint Nicholas church in Łomna

- Location within Poland
- Coordinates: 52°22′57″N 20°46′34″E
- Country: Poland
- Voivodeship: Masovian
- County: Nowy Dwór
- Gmina: Czosnów
- Time zone: UTC+1 (CET)
  - Summer (DST): UTC+2 (CEST)
- Vehicle registration: WND

Łomna [ˈwɔmna] is a village in the administrative district of Gmina Czosnów, within Nowy Dwór County, within the Warsaw metropolitan area, in Masovian Voivodeship, in east-central Poland. It is situated on the left bank of the Vistula River, approximately 3 km (2 mi) south-east of Czosnów, 10 km (6 mi) south-east of Nowy Dwór Mazowiecki, and 24 km (15 mi) north-west of Warsaw.

== History ==
In 1135, the village was granted to the abbey in Czerwińsk nad Wisłą.

In 1827, the village had a population of 465.

A khachkar was unveiled in Łomna in 2023 (see also: Armenians in Poland).
