= Jesionka =

Jesionka may refer to the following places:

- Jesionka, Gostynin County in Masovian Voivodeship (east-central Poland)
- Jesionka, Płońsk County in Masovian Voivodeship (east-central Poland)
- Jesionka, Żyrardów County in Masovian Voivodeship (east-central Poland)
- Jesionka, Gmina Czosnów, Nowy Dwór County in Masovian Voivodeship (east-central Poland)
- Jesionka, Greater Poland Voivodeship (west-central Poland)
- Jesionka, Lubusz Voivodeship (west Poland)
