= Cząstków Polski =

- Village
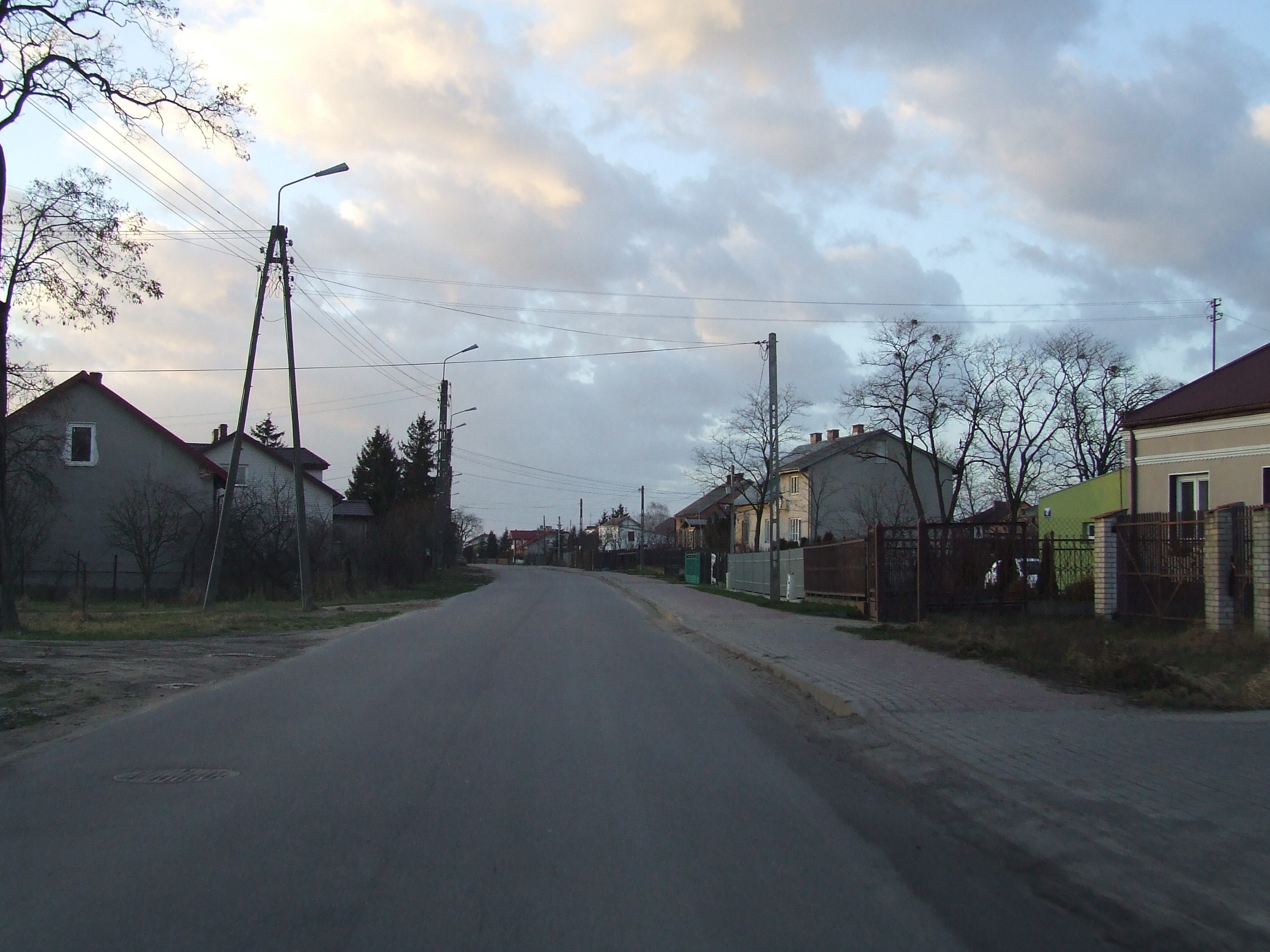
- Houses by the road

- Location within Poland
- Coordinates: 52°23′23″N 20°45′22″E
- Country: Poland
- Voivodeship: Masovian
- County: Nowy Dwór
- Gmina: Czosnów

Cząstków Polski [ˈt͡ʂɔ̃stkuf ˈpɔlski] is a village in the administrative district of Gmina Czosnów, within Nowy Dwór County, Masovian Voivodeship, in east-central Poland.
