= Czeczotki =

- Village
- Location within Poland
- Coordinates: 52°23′01″N 20°39′30″E
- Country: Poland
- Voivodeship: Masovian
- County: Nowy Dwór
- Gmina: Czosnów

Czeczotki [t͡ʂɛˈt͡ʂɔtki] is a village in the administrative district of Gmina Czosnów, within Nowy Dwór County, Masovian Voivodeship, in east-central Poland.
