= Sady, Gmina Czosnów =

Sady
- Village
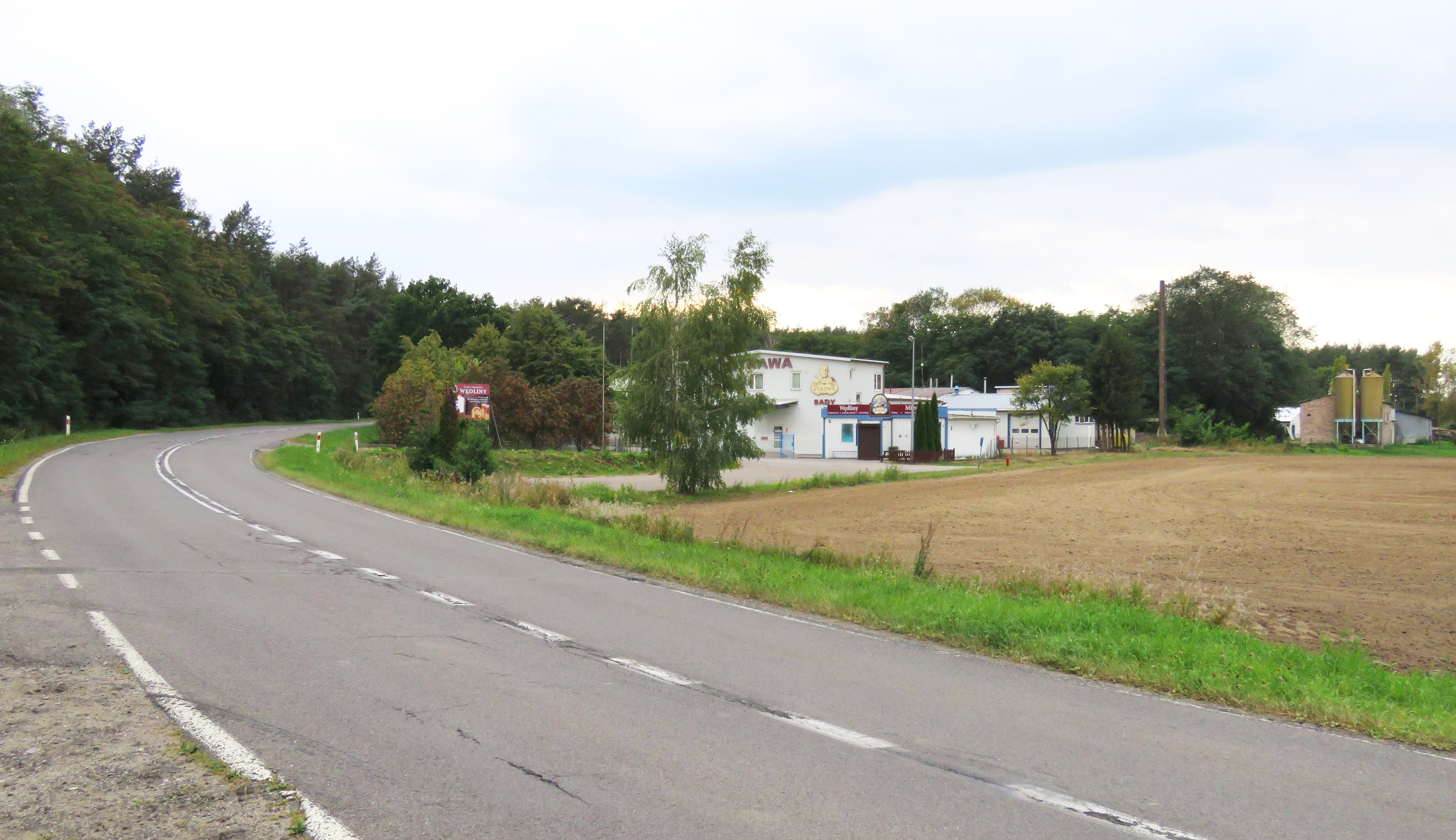

- Location within Poland
- Coordinates: 52°26′N 20°40′E
- Country: Poland
- Voivodeship: Masovian
- County: Nowy Dwór
- Gmina: Czosnów

Sady [ˈsadɨ] is a village in the administrative district of Gmina Czosnów, within Nowy Dwór County, Masovian Voivodeship, in east-central Poland.
