= Sowia Wola =

- Village
- Location within Poland
- Coordinates: 52°22′N 20°39′E
- Country: Poland
- Voivodeship: Masovian
- County: Nowy Dwór
- Gmina: Czosnów

Sowia Wola [ˈsɔvja ˈvɔla] is a village in the administrative district of Gmina Czosnów, within Nowy Dwór County, Masovian Voivodeship, in east-central Poland.
