= Dębina, Masovian Voivodeship =

Dębina
- Village
- Location within Poland
- Coordinates: 52°23′N 20°43′E
- Country: Poland
- Voivodeship: Masovian
- County: Nowy Dwór
- Gmina: Czosnów

Dębina [dɛmˈbina] is a village in the administrative district of Gmina Czosnów, within Nowy Dwór County, Masovian Voivodeship, in east-central Poland.
