= Kazuń Nowy =

- Village
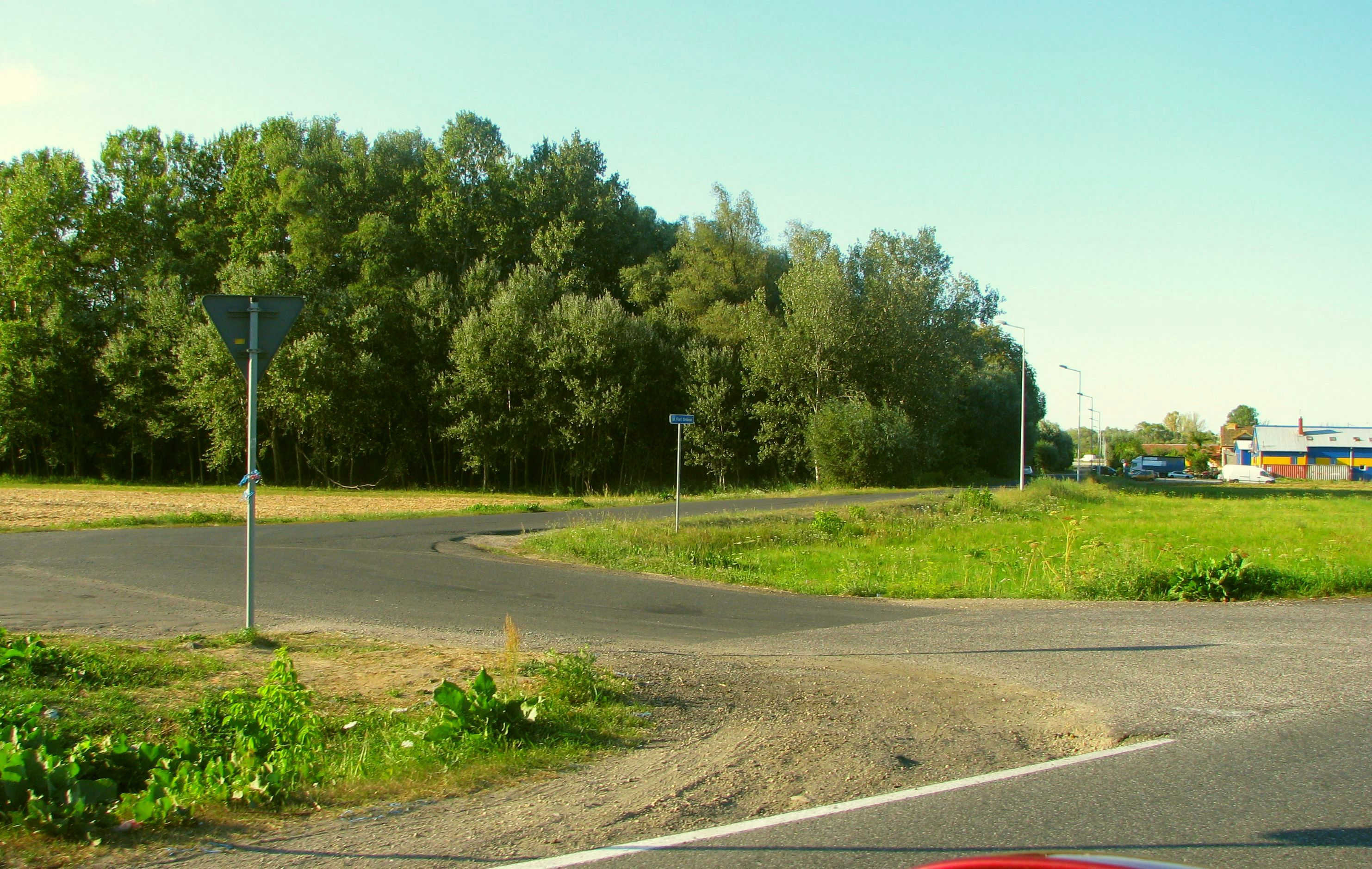

- Location within Poland
- Coordinates: 52°25′9″N 20°41′3″E
- Country: Poland
- Voivodeship: Masovian
- County: Nowy Dwór
- Gmina: Czosnów
- Population (approx.): 500

Kazuń Nowy [ˈkazuɲ ˈnɔvɨ] is a village in the administrative district of Gmina Czosnów, within Nowy Dwór County, Masovian Voivodeship, in east-central Poland. It is situated approximately 6 km (4 mi) north-west of Czosnów, 2 km (1 mi) south of Nowy Dwór Mazowiecki, and 32 km (20 mi) north-west of Warsaw.
