= Dobrzyń, Masovian Voivodeship =

Dobrzyń
- Village
- Location within Poland
- Coordinates: 52°22′24″N 20°42′51″E
- Country: Poland
- Voivodeship: Masovian
- County: Nowy Dwór
- Gmina: Czosnów

Dobrzyń [ˈdɔbʐɨɲ] is a village in the administrative district of Gmina Czosnów, within Nowy Dwór County, Masovian Voivodeship, in east-central Poland.
