= Kazuń-Bielany =

- Village
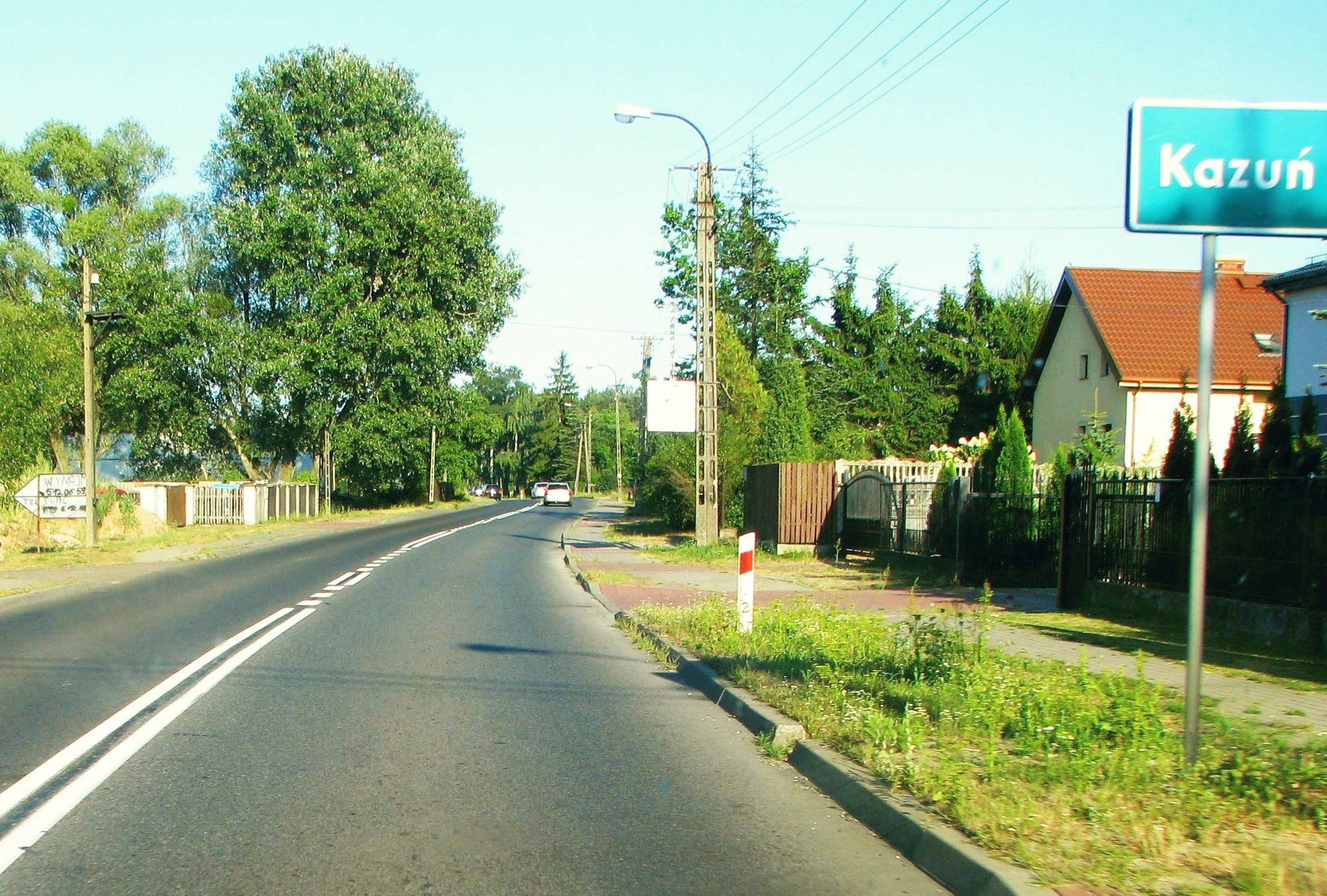

- Location within Poland
- Coordinates: 52°24′37″N 20°40′40″E
- Country: Poland
- Voivodeship: Masovian
- County: Nowy Dwór
- Gmina: Czosnów

Kazuń-Bielany [ˈkazuɲ bjɛˈlanɨ] is a village in the administrative district of Gmina Czosnów, within Nowy Dwór County, Masovian Voivodeship, in east-central Poland.
