= Izabelin-Dziekanówek =

- Village
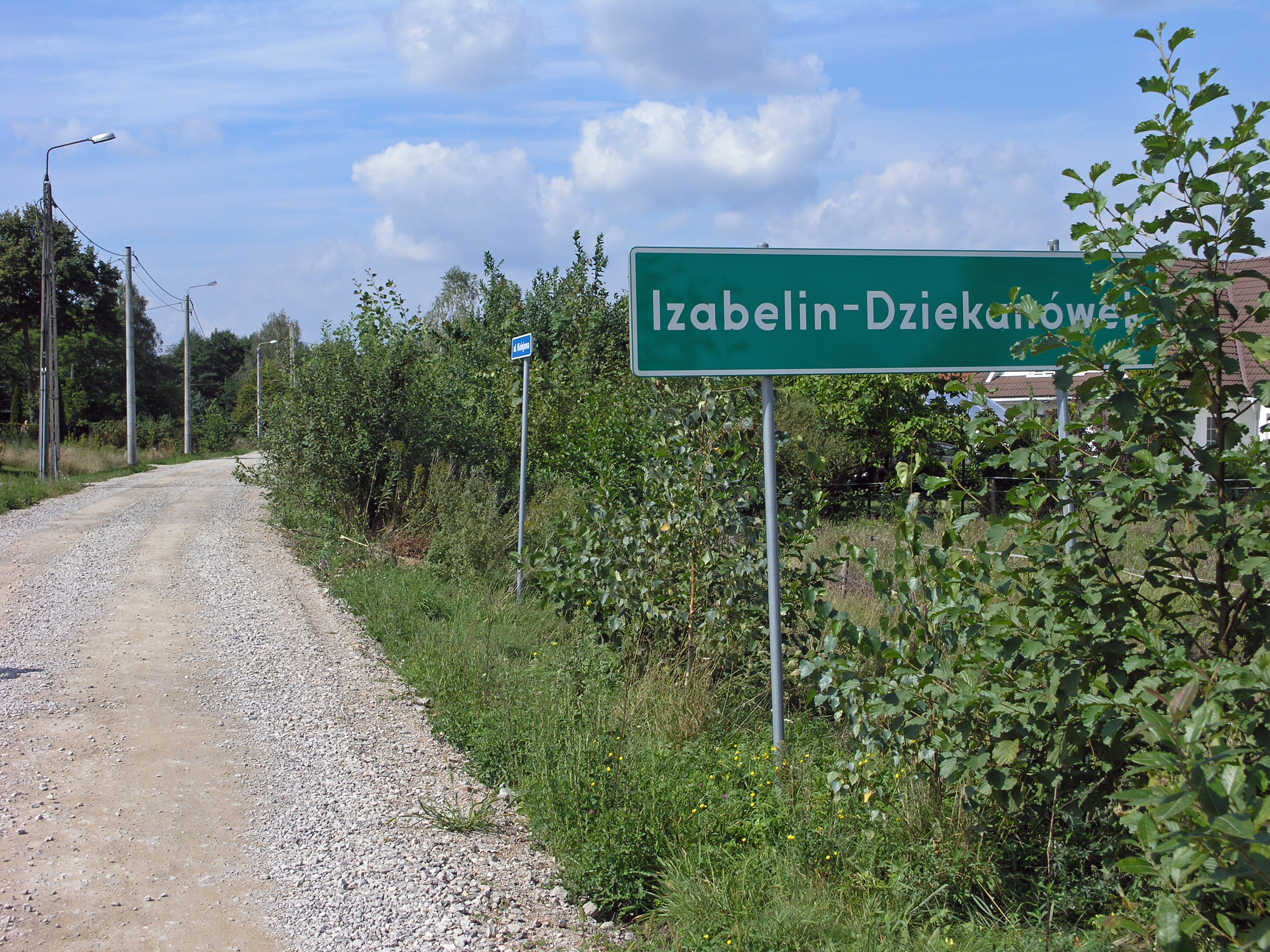
- Kolejowa Street (2014)

- Location within Poland
- Coordinates: 52°18′N 20°50′E
- Country: Poland
- Voivodeship: Masovian
- County: Nowy Dwór
- Gmina: Czosnów
- Population: 477 (2,023)

Izabelin-Dziekanówek [izaˈbɛlin d͡ʑɛkaˈnuvɛk] is a village in the administrative district of Gmina Czosnów, within Nowy Dwór County, Masovian Voivodeship, in east-central Poland.

== History ==
This village is existing since 1 January 2003, as the result of unification of Izabelin and part of this village - Dziekanówek.

=== Dziekanówek ===
In past, Dziekanówek was a separated village, in Warsaw Voivodship, Warsaw County (after 1952 - Nowy Dwór County) and Gmina Cząstków. In 1933, it has created Gromada Dziekanówek.

In 1943, in Dziekanówek lived 142 inhabitants.

In 1954-1959, Dziekanówek was in Gromada Pieńków, later - in 1959-1973 - in Gromada Czosnów.

In 1973 Dziekanówek became part of Izabelin.
