= Cząstków Mazowiecki =

- Village
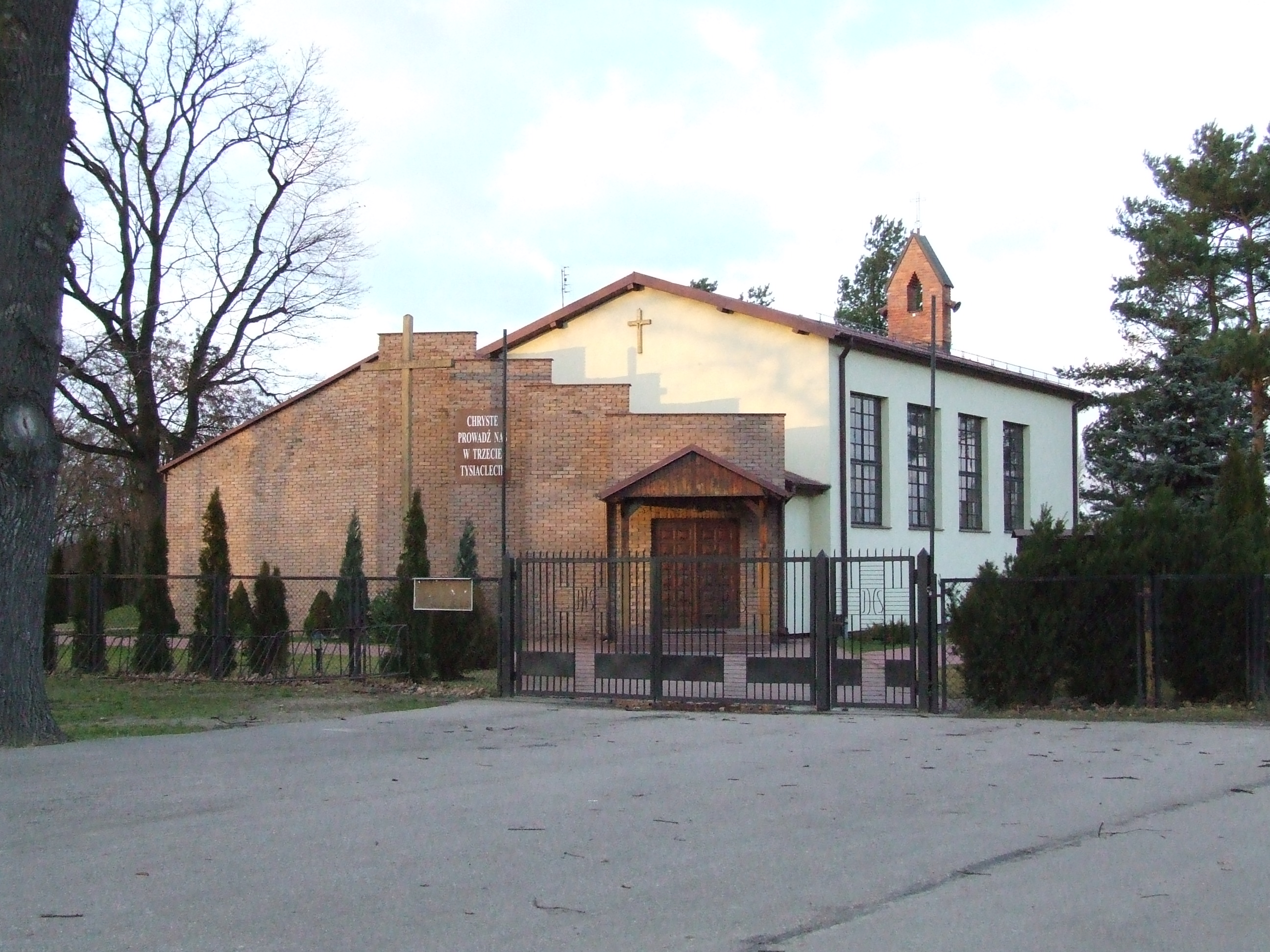
- Church in Cząstków

- Location within Poland
- Coordinates: 52°23′31″N 20°44′54″E
- Country: Poland
- Voivodeship: Masovian
- County: Nowy Dwór
- Gmina: Czosnów

Cząstków Mazowiecki [ˈt͡ʂɔ̃stkuf mazɔˈvjɛt͡ski] is a village in the administrative district of Gmina Czosnów, within Nowy Dwór County, Masovian Voivodeship, in east-central Poland.
