= Cybulice Małe =

- Village
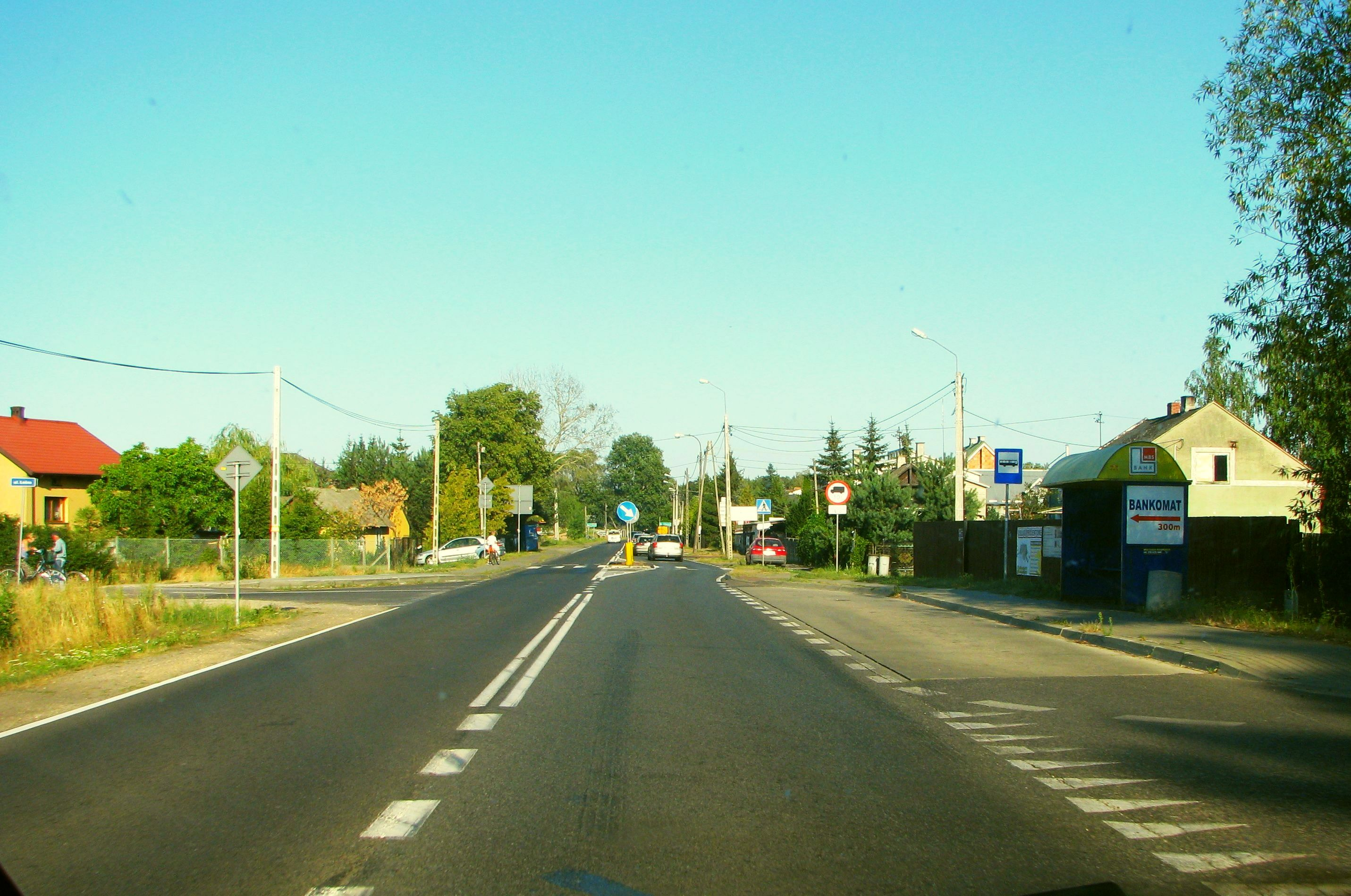

- Location within Poland
- Coordinates: 52°23′N 20°38′E
- Country: Poland
- Voivodeship: Masovian
- County: Nowy Dwór
- Gmina: Czosnów

Cybulice Małe [t͡sɨbuˈlit͡sɛ ˈmawɛ] is a village in the administrative district of Gmina Czosnów, within Nowy Dwór County, Masovian Voivodeship, in east-central Poland.
