= Augustówek =

- Village
- Location within Poland
- Coordinates: 52°21′N 21°4′E
- Country: Poland
- Voivodeship: Masovian
- County: Nowy Dwór
- Gmina: Czosnów

Augustówek [auɡusˈtuvɛk] is a village in the administrative district of Gmina Czosnów, within Nowy Dwór County, Masovian Voivodeship, in east-central Poland.
