= Sowia Wola Folwarczna =

- Village
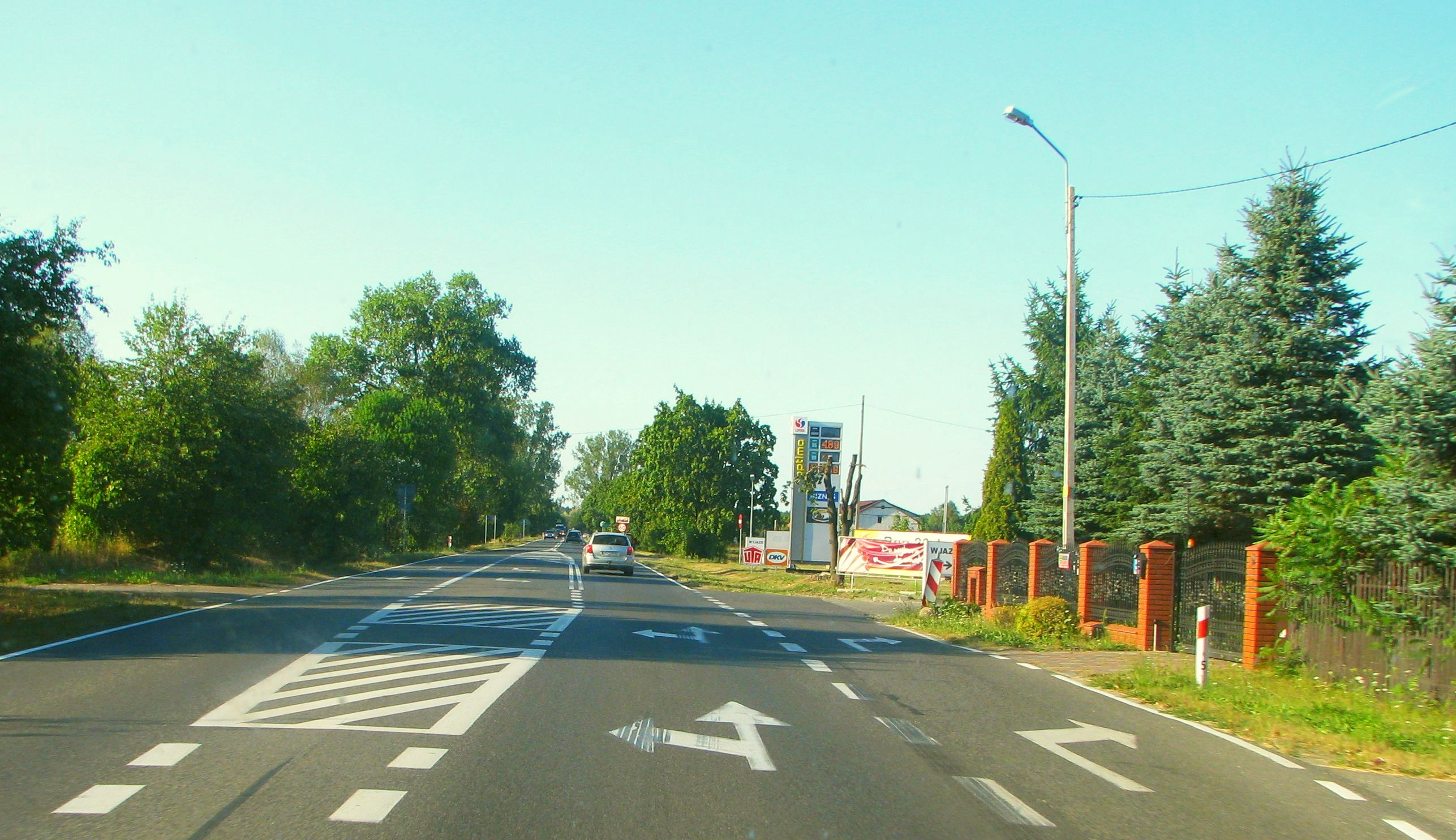

- Location within Poland
- Coordinates: 52°21′57″N 20°37′45″E
- Country: Poland
- Voivodeship: Masovian
- County: Nowy Dwór
- Gmina: Czosnów

Sowia Wola Folwarczna [ˈsɔvja ˈvɔla fɔlˈvart͡ʂna] is a village in the administrative district of Gmina Czosnów, within Nowy Dwór County, Masovian Voivodeship, in east-central Poland.
