= Truskawka, Masovian Voivodeship =

Truskawka
- Village
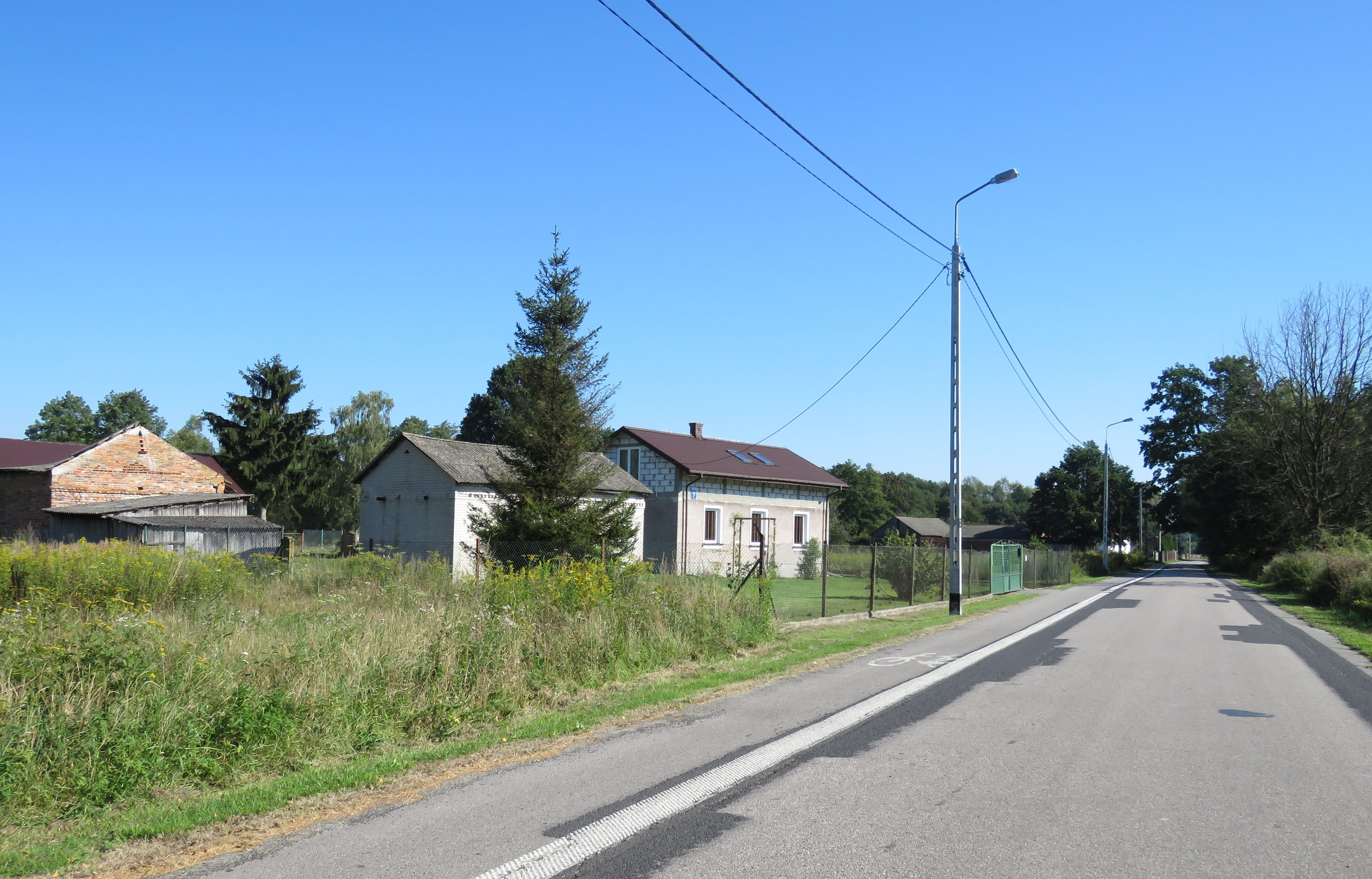

- Location within Poland
- Coordinates: 52°20′02″N 20°41′09″E
- Country: Poland
- Voivodeship: Masovian
- County: Nowy Dwór
- Gmina: Czosnów
- Population: 140

Truskawka [trusˈkafka] is a village in the administrative district of Gmina Czosnów, within Nowy Dwór County, Masovian Voivodeship, in east-central Poland.
