= Palmiry =

- Village
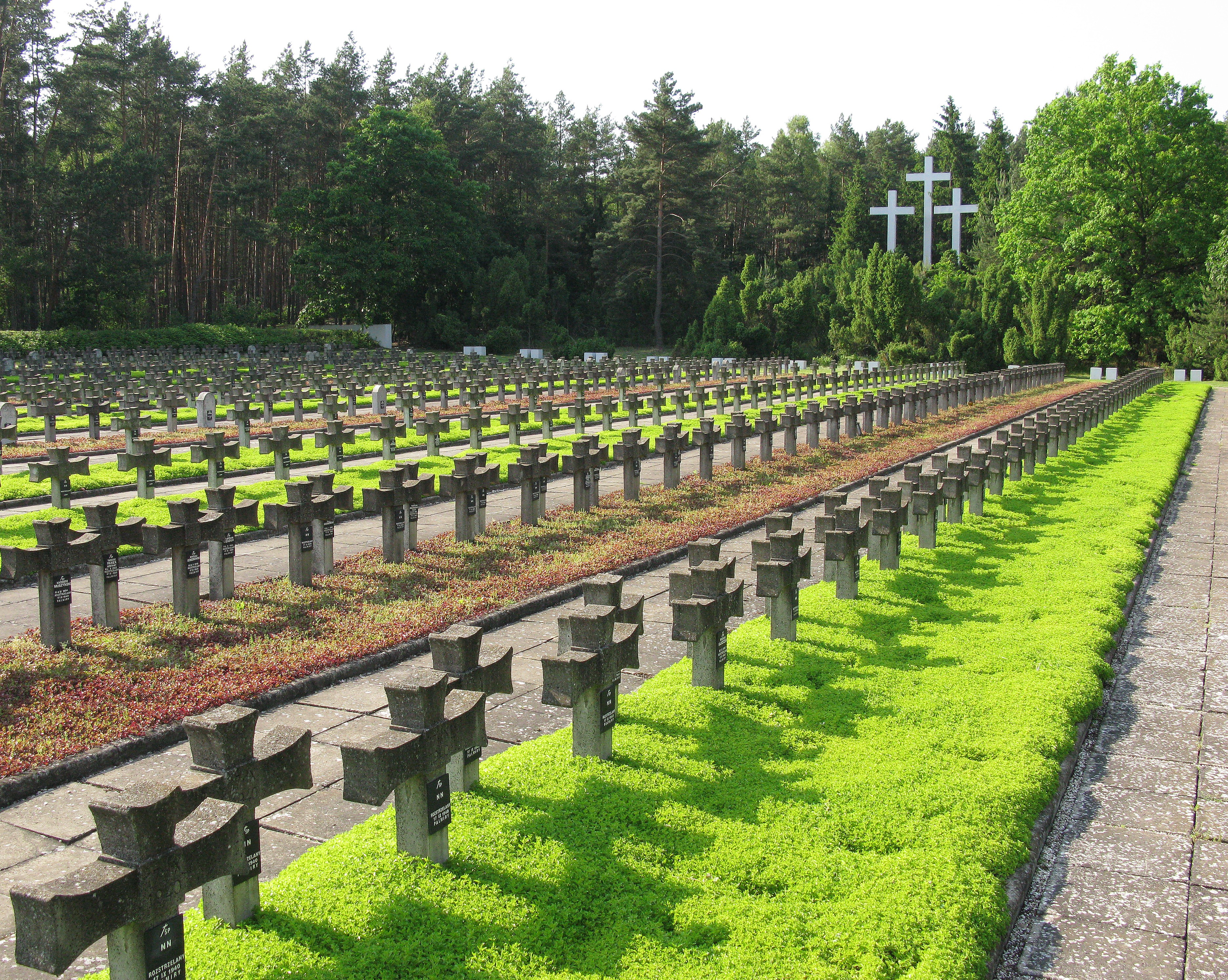
- Cemetery in Palmiry

- Location within Poland
- Coordinates: 52°22′N 20°47′E
- Country: Poland
- Voivodeship: Masovian
- County: Nowy Dwór
- Gmina: Czosnów
- Population: 220

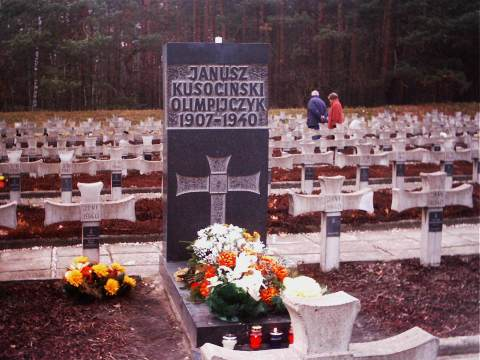
Tomb of Janusz Kusociński

Palmiry ([palˈmirɨ]) is a village in the administrative district of Gmina Czosnów, within Nowy Dwór County, Masovian Voivodeship, in east-central Poland. In 2000 the village had an approximate population of 220.

== Mass executions during German occupation of Poland ==
During World War II, between 1939 and 1943, the village and the surrounding forest were one of the sites of the Nazi German mass executions of Jews, Polish intelligentsia, politicians and athletes, killed during the German AB-Aktion in Poland. Most of the victims were first arrested and tortured in the Pawiak prison in Warsaw, then transferred to the execution site. In total, about 1,700 Poles were murdered there in secret executions between December 7, 1939 and July 17, 1941.

In 1946, the bodies were exhumed and reburied in a new cemetery, situated approximately 5 kilometres from the village itself. The reburial site has been a Polish national mausoleum since 1948.
