= Janówek, Gmina Czosnów =

Janówek
- Village
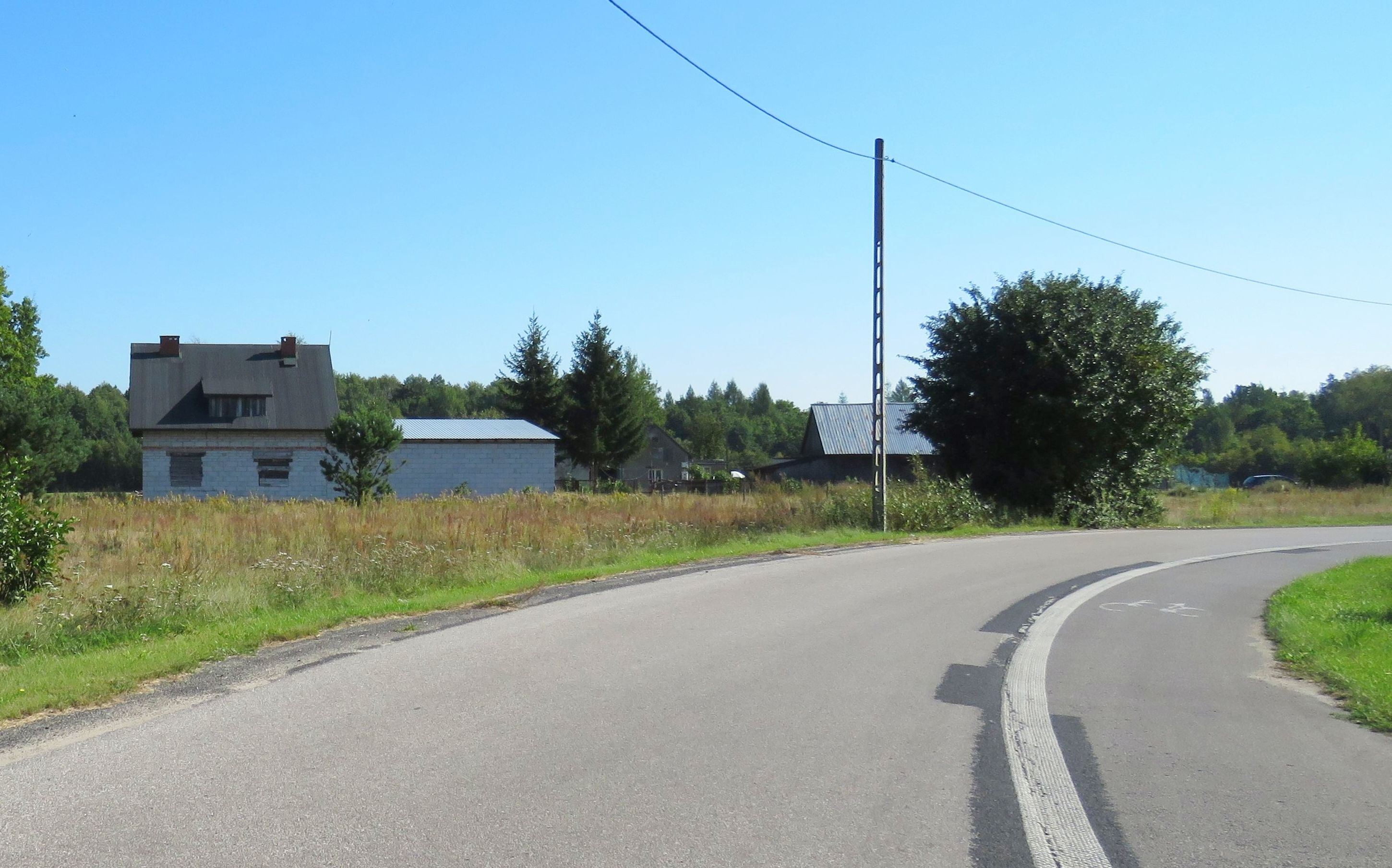

- Location within Poland
- Coordinates: 52°20′47″N 20°43′13″E
- Country: Poland
- Voivodeship: Masovian
- County: Nowy Dwór
- Gmina: Czosnów

Janówek [jaˈnuvɛk] is a village in the administrative district of Gmina Czosnów, within Nowy Dwór County, Masovian Voivodeship, in east-central Poland.
