= Aleksandrów, Gmina Czosnów =

Aleksandrów
- Village
- Location within Poland
- Coordinates: 52°20′8″N 20°37′21″E
- Country: Poland
- Voivodeship: Masovian
- County: Nowy Dwór
- Gmina: Czosnów

Aleksandrów [alɛkˈsandruf] is a village in the administrative district of Gmina Czosnów, within Nowy Dwór County, Masovian Voivodeship, in east-central Poland.
