= Gmina Czosnów =

Gmina Czosnów Czosnów Commune
- Gmina
- Coat of arms

- Location within Poland
- Coordinates (Czosnów): 52°23′N 20°44′E
- Country: Poland
- Voivodeship: Masovian
- County: Nowy Dwór
- Seat: Czosnów

Area
  - Total: 128.34 km^{2} (49.55 sq mi)

Population (2011)
  - Total: 9,474
  - Density: 73.82/km^{2} (191.2/sq mi)
- Website: www.czosnow.pl

Gmina Czosnów is a rural gmina (administrative district) in Nowy Dwór County, Masovian Voivodeship, in east-central Poland. Its seat is the village of Czosnów, which lies approximately 7 kilometres (4 mi) south-east of Nowy Dwór Mazowiecki and 26 km (16 mi) north-west of Warsaw.

The gmina covers an area of 128.34 square kilometres (49.6 sq mi), and as of 2006 its total population is 8,743 (9,474 in 2011).

== Villages ==
Gmina Czosnów contains the villages and settlements of Adamówek, Aleksandrów, Augustówek, Brzozówka, Cybulice, Cybulice Duże, Cybulice Małe, Cząstków Mazowiecki, Cząstków Polski, Czeczotki, Czosnów, Dąbrówka, Dębina, Dobrzyń, Izabelin-Dziekanówek, Janów-Mikołajówka, Janówek, Jesionka, Kaliszki, Kazuń Nowy, Kazuń Polski, Kazuń-Bielany, Kiścinne, Łomna, Łomna Las, Łosia Wólka, Małocice, Palmiry, Pieńków, Sady, Sowia Wola, Sowia Wola Folwarczna, Truskawka, Wiersze, Wólka Czosnowska and Wrzosówka.

== Neighbouring gminas ==
Gmina Czosnów is bordered by the town of Nowy Dwór Mazowiecki and by the gminas of Izabelin, Jabłonna, Leoncin, Leszno, Łomianki and Zakroczym.
