= Czosnów =

- Village
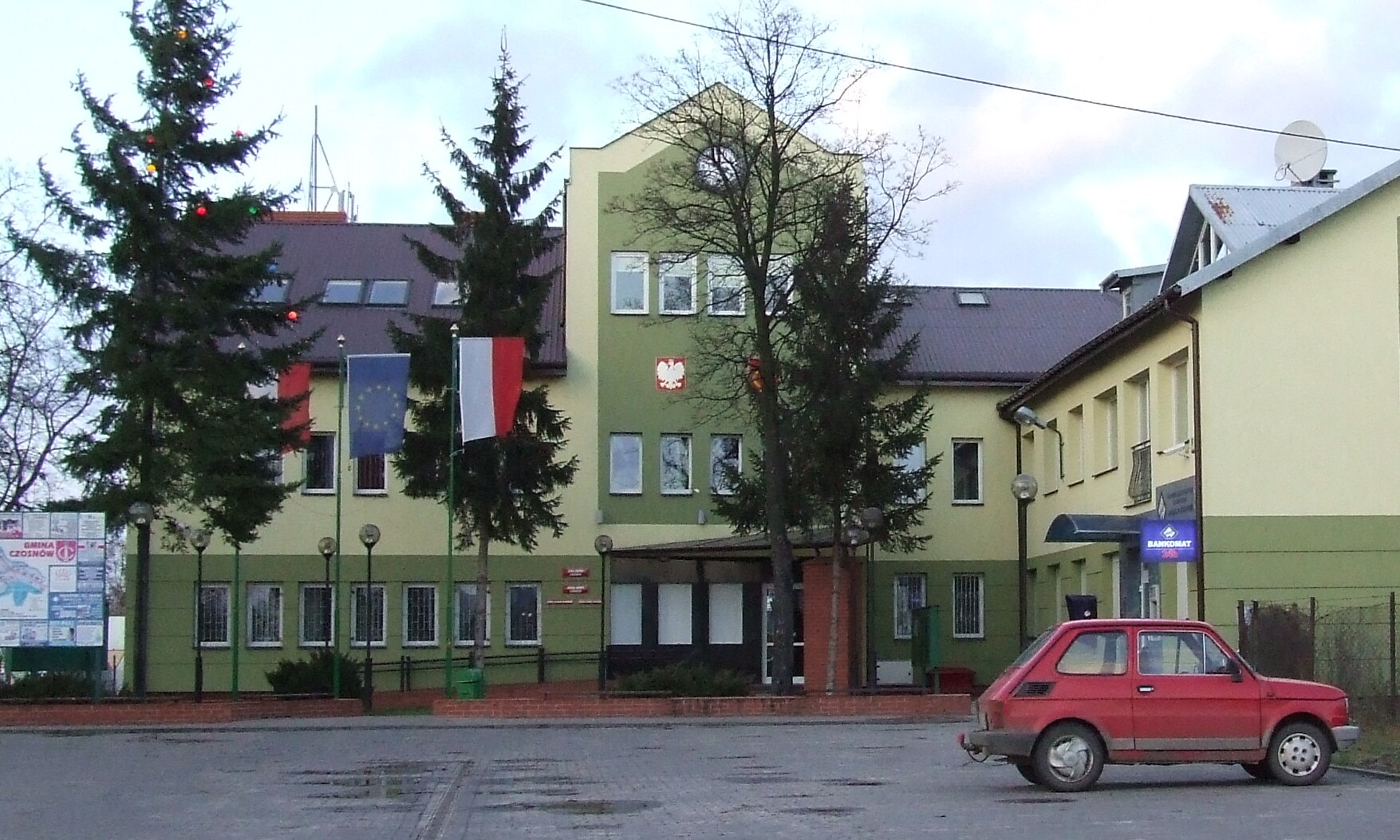
- Gmina Czosnów administration building

- Location within Poland
- Coordinates: 52°23′N 20°44′E
- Country: Poland
- Voivodeship: Masovian
- County: Nowy Dwór
- Gmina: Czosnów

Population (2021)
  - Total: 652

Czosnów [ˈt͡ʂɔsnuf] is a village in Nowy Dwór County, Masovian Voivodeship, in east-central Poland. It is the seat of the gmina (administrative district) called Gmina Czosnów.
