= Battle of Jaktorów =

Partisan battle fought during World War II in Poland

- Part of the Warsaw Uprising
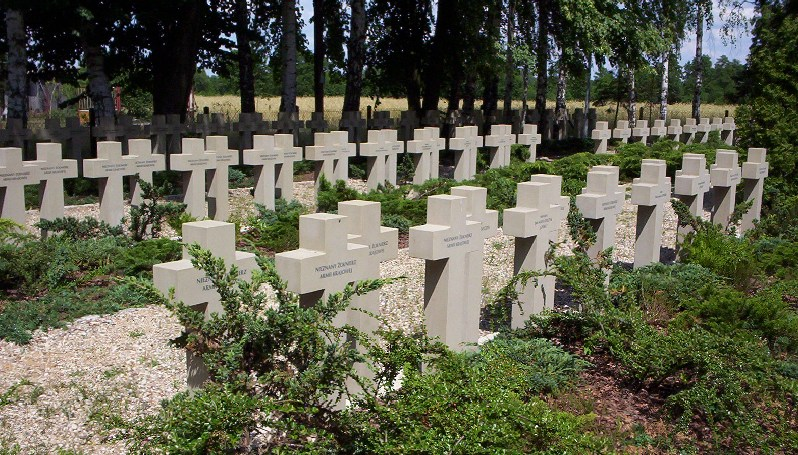
- Cemetery of soldiers of the Kampinos Group in Budy Zosine
Date	September 29, 1944
Location	Surroundings of the village of Budy Zosine near Jaktorów 52°5′24.32″N 20°31′11.11″E
Result	Germany Victory
Territorial changes	Poland under German occupation (General Government)

Belligerents
Polish Underground State	Germany

Commanders and leaders
Alfons Kotowski †	Friedrich Bernhardt; Colonel König

Strength
Approximately 1,200 soldiers 20mm cal. cannon several mortars	Approx. 2,000 soldiers approx. 40 armored vehicles (including several tanks) armored train No. 30 air support

Casualties and losses
200 killed approx. 120 wounded approx. 150 taken prisoner all heavy armaments and rolling stock	100 killed and wounded 1 aircraft several armored vehicles destroyed or damaged
- Location within Poland

The Battle of Jaktorów was a partisan battle fought on 29 September 1944 near the village of Budy Zosine close to Jaktorów, ending with the defeat of the main forces of the Kampinos Group by the Germans.

After the outbreak of the Warsaw Uprising, the eastern and central areas of the Kampinos Forest became a base for a strong partisan group of the Home Army. On 27 September 1944, the Germans launched a large-scale anti-partisan operation in this area, codenamed Sternschnuppe. The Kampinos Group then began to retreat towards the Świętokrzyskie Mountains. Initially, the Polish group successfully evaded the German encirclement, but due to command errors, they were surrounded by the Germans on the second day of the retreat near Jaktorów. After nearly a full day of fighting against superior enemy forces, the Kampinos Group was defeated, losing from 150 to 200 killed, around 120 wounded, and 150 taken prisoner. However, many Home Army soldiers, including several cohesive units, managed to break out of the encirclement.

The Battle of Jaktorów was likely the largest partisan battle fought during World War II on Polish territory west of the Vistula river.

== "Independent Republic of Kampinos" ==
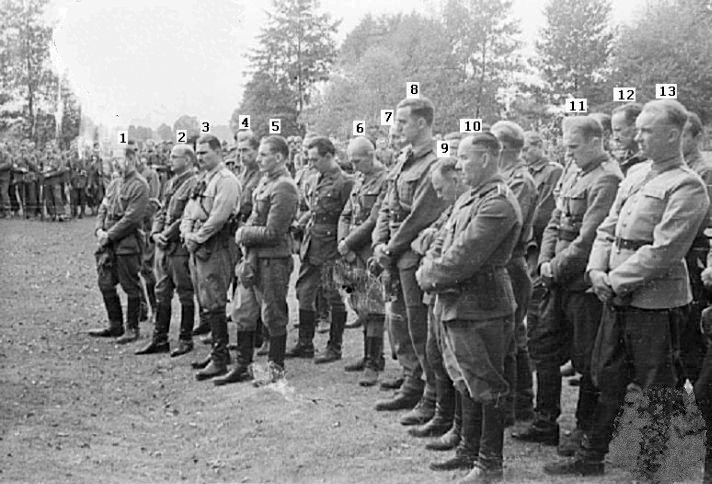
Officers of the Kampinos Group during a field mass in Wiersze. Visible in the photo are, among others, Major Okoń and Lieutenant Dolina

After the outbreak of the Warsaw Uprising, the Kampinos Forest also became a theater of military operations, with units from the VIII Region Łęgi of the Warsaw County Subdistrict of the Warsaw District joining the fight. This region was commanded by Captain Józef Krzyczkowski, codenamed Szymon. On the eve of the uprising, his Home Army structures could muster two infantry battalions comprising five frontline companies, although only from 350 to 400 soldiers were armed. Fortunately for the Polish side, the balance of power in the Kampinos Forest changed dramatically at the end of July 1944, when the Stowbtsy-Naliboki Group of the Home Army, which had arrived from the Naliboki Forest in the Eastern Borderlands, took up position in Dziekanów Polski. The group consisted of 861 well-armed soldiers led by Lieutenant Adolf Pilch, codenamed Góra or Dolina – a Silent Unseen paratrooper and experienced partisan who had been fighting the Germans and Soviet partisans since the fall of 1943. After the uprising began, small Home Army units from various districts of Warsaw also appeared in the Kampinos Forest, having left the city after the failure of the initial Polish attacks during the "W" Hour. Gradually, units from other areas of the Warsaw County Subdistrict and the neighboring Western Subdistrict of the Warsaw Area (codenamed Hallerowo or Hajduki) also arrived.

In mid-August 1944, a partisan group called the Kampinos Group was formed from the units continuously arriving in the forest. At its peak, it numbered around 2,700 soldiers and 700 horses. By the end of August, the Kampinos Group controlled the central and eastern areas of the Kampinos Forest, including the villages of Ławy, Łubiec, Roztoka, Kiścinne, Krogulec, Wędziszew, Brzozówka, Truskawka, Janówek, Pociecha, Zaborów Leśny, and Wiersze. Polish patrols could also penetrate numerous neighboring localities not yet occupied by the enemy. The area controlled by the Home Army soldiers was called the "Independent Republic of Kampinos". Its informal capital was Wiersze, where the headquarters of the Kampinos Group was located.

The Kampinos Group was the only organized Home Army unit to carry out General Tadeusz Bór-Komorowski's order of 14 August 1944 to organize a relief effort for the capital. More than 900 well-armed "forest" soldiers moved from the Kampinos Forest to Warsaw's Żoliborz district. However, two night assaults on the heavily fortified Warszawa Gdańska railway station ended in failure and the loss of nearly 500 soldiers (on the nights of August 20/21 and 21/22). After the defeat at the Warszawa Gdańska railway station, the Home Army High Command assigned the Kampinos Group tasks of a primarily passive nature, focusing on receiving Allied airdrops and organizing regular deliveries of weapons and supplies for the fighting capital. By the end of August, however, the Germans had completely blocked communication between the forest and insurgent Warsaw. At the same time, the Home Army High Command lost interest in the Kampinos Forest, concluding that relief or substantial supplies from there could no longer be expected. From then on, the actions of the Kampinos Group were treated by the Polish command as part of the operations of insurgent Żoliborz.

Meanwhile, from mid-August, the Germans began limited offensive actions against the Kampinos Group, aiming to push Polish outposts away from the strategically important Warsaw–Modlin road. A second focal point of the fighting emerged around the area of Kampinos, Leszno, Borzęcin, and Zaborów, where the enemy tried to drive Polish units deeper into the forest, fearing that their presence in this region might threaten the strategically vital Poznań–Sochaczew–Warsaw road. The Germans and their collaborators also conducted limited offensive actions in the area of Truskaw and Pociecha. Almost until the end of September, the Polish group successfully held their positions, tying down significant enemy forces. The Poles also undertook numerous raids on German outposts and communication lines. Notable successes included the clash at Kiścinne and raids on the collaborative Kaminski Brigade units quartered in Truskaw and Marianów.

By mid-September, it was already clear that the Warsaw Uprising was heading towards defeat. It was expected that after the fighting in the capital ended, the Germans would proceed to "clear" the Kampinos Forest. In these circumstances, remaining near Warsaw posed a threat of annihilation for the entire Kampinos Group. The upcoming autumn chills made it clear that the villages in Kampinos would not be able to provide enough food, clothing, and dry shelters for the numerous partisan group. On September 14, Major Okoń sent a dispatch to the Chief of Staff of the Home Army Headquarters, General Tadeusz Pełczyński, codenamed Grzegorz, informing that the Germans were tightening the encirclement around the forest and asking for instructions on further actions. The response came two days later, containing an order for the entire group to break through to Colonel Mieczysław Niedzielski's, codenamed Żywiciel, units in Żoliborz. Orders of this kind were repeatedly issued by the insurgent command. However, Okoń was convinced that his units were not suited for urban combat, so without directly refusing to carry out the orders from the Home Army Headquarters, he decided to break through with his soldiers to the Świętokrzyskie Mountains, where he intended to continue the fight against the occupier in cooperation with local Home Army units. As early as September 12, Okoń had sent a radio dispatch to the Polish headquarters in Brindisi, requesting that, in addition to weapons and ammunition, detailed maps of the Świętokrzyskie Mountains and Silesia be included in the containers dropped by Allied aircraft over the Kampinos Forest.

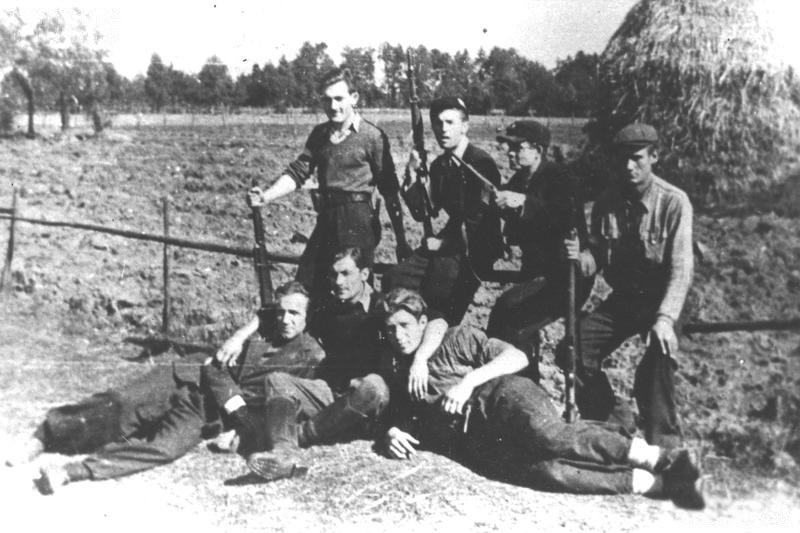
Soldiers of Major Korwin's Sochaczew Battalion

The news of Okoń's intentions reached the command of the Western District of the Home Army Hajduki, from which one of the strongest units of the Kampinos Group, Major Korwin's Sochaczew Battalion, originated. The district command decided that Korwin's soldiers would not participate in the planned evacuation and would be demobilized when it began. (Note: Most of the Kampinos Forest and its entire territorial hinterland were under the jurisdiction of the Western District of the Home Army Hajduki. However, Major Okoń, citing orders received from the Home Army Main Headquarters, refused to subordinate himself to the Hajduki command. As a result, Colonel Franciszek Jachieć, codenamed Roman, the commander of the Western District of the Home Army, issued an order to Major Korwin to cooperate with Major Okoń only on tactical matters. In practice, this meant that the commander of the Sochaczew Battalion had the right to disregard Okoń's orders if he disagreed with them (Gozdawa-Gołębiowski (1992, p. 474)).) This decision was communicated to the Kampinos Group command, simultaneously proposing to Okoń the demobilization of the entire group. However, the decision to retreat to the Świętokrzyskie Mountains was supported by the commanders of those Home Army units whose soldiers were from the Kampinos Forest area or had limited possibilities to hide among the local civilian population.

Around September 20, Major Okoń sent a written request to the Hajduki district command for the deployment of German forces located along the planned retreat route – i.e., between the Kampinos Forest and the forests around Żyrardów and Skierniewice. This request was granted, with the caveat that not only could permanent enemy garrisons be encountered along the route, but also armored and motorized units, alarmed by the march of a strong partisan group. The district command expressed the belief that the evacuation of the entire Kampinos Group to the Świętokrzyskie Mountains had little chance of success and that such an attempt could result in the group being intercepted in open terrain and consequently completely destroyed. The Hajduki command again proposed the demobilization of the Kampinos units, offering assistance in relocating and caring for the soldiers. As an alternative, they suggested that Okoń break through with all forces to Warsaw's Żoliborz to continue the fight in the capital. However, the commander of the Kampinos Group left both proposals unanswered.

Between September 24 and 26, the forest units carried out several raids to gather food supplies before the planned march. By then, Polish intelligence and forward outposts were reporting increased enemy activity and the concentration of significant German forces near the forest.

== Order of the Kampinos Group at the end of September 1944 ==
At the end of September 1944, the strength and structure of the Kampinos Group were as follows:

- Regiment Palmiry-Młociny (Second Lieutenant Adolf Pilch, codenamed Dolina)
  - regimental headquarters and staff: 6 officers, 32 non-commissioned officers (NCOs), 24 enlisted men, 8 women (Note: Under the term "women" in this list are included: medics, couriers, and female soldiers serving in rear formations.)
  - quartermaster corps: 8 officers, 11 NCOs, 17 enlisted men, 29 women
  - I Squadron of the 27th Uhlan Regiment (Captain Zdzisław Nurkiewicz, codenamed Nieczaj)
    - Headquarters: 2 officers, 7 NCOs, 6 enlisted men, 6 women
    - 1st Squadron: led by Staff Sergeant Jan Jakubowski, codenamed Wołodyjowski: 18 NCOs, 84 enlisted men, 4 women
    - 2nd Squadron: led by Staff Sergeant Józef Niedźwiecki, codenamed Lawina: 26 NCOs, 101 enlisted men
    - 3rd Squadron: led by Sergeant Cadet Narcyz Kulikowski, codenamed Narcyz: 17 NCOs, 99 enlisted men, 2 women
    - 4th Squadron: led by Second Lieutenant Aleksander Pietrucki, codenamed Jawor: 1 officer, 25 NCOs, 59 enlisted men, 2 women
  - Machine Gun Squadron: led by Lieutenant Jarosław Gąsiewski, codenamed Jar, forming the nucleus of the 23rd Grodno Uhlan Regiment: 3 officers, 42 NCOs, 83 enlisted men, 1 woman
  - II Battalion of the 78th Słuck Rifles Regiment (Second Lieutenant Witold Lenczewski, codenamed Strzała)
    - Headquarters: 4 officers, 8 NCOs, 13 riflemen, 2 women
    - 2nd Company: led by Second Lieutenant Zygmunt Sokołowski, codenamed Zetes: 3 officers, 40 NCOs, 149 riflemen, 2 women
    - 3rd Company: led by Sergeant Walerian Żuchowicz, codenamed Opończa: 3 officers, 25 NCOs, 125 riflemen, 11 women
    - Machine Gun Company: led by Second Lieutenant Henryk Dobak, codenamed Olsza: 6 officers, 34 NCOs, 77 riflemen, 8 women
    - Pioneers Platoon: 3 officers, 15 NCOs, 38 riflemen, 1 woman
    - Cavalry Reconnaissance Platoon: 1 officer, 16 NCOs, 65 riflemen, 3 women
- Other units of the Kampinos Group
  - Sochaczew Battalion: led by Major Władysław Starzyk, codenamed Korwin: 30 officers, 451 NCOs and enlisted men
  - Legionowo Battalion: led by Second Lieutenant Bolesław Szymkiewicz, codenamed Znicz: 15 officers, 170 NCOs and enlisted men
  - Zemsta Company from the Pięść Battalion: led by Second Lieutenant Stefan Matuszczyk, codenamed Porawa: 6 officers, 115 NCOs and enlisted men
  - Company of Special Insurgent Units Jerzyki: led by Second Lieutenant Jerzy Strzałkowski, codenamed Jerzy: 5 officers, 119 NCOs and enlisted men
  - Independent Air Company for Special Tasks: (Note: Adam Borkiewicz placed the air company of Lieutenant Lawa within the II Infantry Battalion of the Palmiry-Młociny Regiment, but this is not confirmed by other sources (Borkiewicz (1969, p. 528); Nowak (2011, p. 114)).) led by Second Lieutenant Tadeusz Gaworski, codenamed Lawa: 4 officers, 29 NCOs, 34 riflemen, 3 women
  - Company from Wiersze: led by Second Lieutenant Franciszek Wiszniowski, codenamed Jurek: 1 officer, 75 NCOs and enlisted men
  - Smaller subunits

The Kampinos Group had a total of 2,432 soldiers, with the strongest unit, the Palmiry-Młociny Regiment, comprising 40 officers and 1,335 non-commissioned officers and soldiers (including 652 infantrymen and 588 lancers). This count does not include foreigners fighting within the Home Army units (i.e., Hungarian volunteers, Dutch fighters, and Soviet prisoners of war freed from German captivity). It also excludes the People's Army unit under Second Lieutenant Teodor Kufel, codenamed Teoch, as it did not subordinate to the Kampinos Group command (the People's Army unit's strength ranged from a dozen to forty soldiers). Therefore, it can be assumed that the total number of partisans stationed in the Kampinos Forest area at the end of September 1944 ranged from 2,400 to 2,500.

The Kampinos Group was commanded by Major Alfons Kotowski, codenamed Okoń. He was an energetic commander with unquestionable personal courage. However, as a pre-war professional officer, he struggled to adapt to the specifics of guerrilla warfare. Okoń also failed to earn the respect and trust of his subordinates. Due to his explosive temperament and coarse demeanor, he was widely disliked by officers and soldiers, with many cases of outright hatred. At one point, a group of junior officers even proposed removing Okoń from his command of the Kampinos Group. However, Lieutenant Dolina persuaded them against this plan.

== Operation Falling Star ==
The presence of a strong partisan group directly behind the front lines was a significant concern for the German command. The threat posed by the Kampinos Group to German rear lines was discussed at a special meeting in the 9th Army headquarters on 20 September 1944. It was concluded that the partisans' presence in the Kampinos Forest significantly complicated the supply lines for the IV SS Panzer Corps fighting in the Modlin area. German staff officers were particularly worried that if the Red Army resumed vigorous offensive operations, the Kampinos Group could effectively support potential Soviet efforts to establish bridgeheads on the left bank of the Vistula river (north of Warsaw).

Moreover, in the second half of September, the 9th Army command received reports of a large mobilization allegedly planned by the Home Army Command on the lands west of the Vistula. German intelligence indicated that this mobilization aimed to form six partisan divisions, with the Kampinos Group units as their core. The German command's concerns were heightened by intelligence significantly overestimating the size of the Polish group. In the second half of August 1944, the 9th Army command estimated that about 5,000 soldiers were fighting in the Kampinos Group. Some informants even claimed that the number of partisans in the Kampinos Forest reached 15,000, supposedly equipped with artillery and anti-aircraft defenses. The Germans' belief in the large size of the Kampinos Group was likely reinforced by the vigorous actions of the Polish cavalry, which frequently attacked and raided areas far apart.

With the Soviet offensive on the Warsaw front halted and the Warsaw Uprising clearly nearing collapse, the German command decided that the time was right to eliminate the Kampinos Group. On 22 September 1944, the 9th Army headquarters began working on a plan for a large-scale anti-partisan operation, codenamed Sternschnuppe (English: Falling Star). That same day, a detailed operational order (No. 5199/44) was issued. The task of eliminating the Home Army units in the Kampinos Forest was assigned to Lieutenant General Friedrich Bernhardt, commander of the 532nd Army Rear Area (Korück 532). His units were to advance along an east–west axis, gradually "clearing" the forest (initially up to the Modlin–Błonie line). The operation was scheduled to commence on September 27.

In connection with the operation against the Kampinos Group, Bernhardt was given command of an ad hoc tactical group, divided into two combat groups. During Operation Sternschnuppe, Bernhardt and his Korück 532 staff were also subordinated to the so-called Von dem Bach Corps Group (German: Korpsgruppe von dem Bach) fighting in Warsaw. The following units were deployed to combat the Kampinos Group:

- Units directly subordinated to the tactical group:
  - 104th Engineer Regiment
  - for evacuation:
    - emergency battalion of the rear command
    - 2nd company of the 234th Battalion
    - field gendarmerie company
  - for reconnaissance:
    - Reconnaissance Group Widder
    - 308th Frontline Reconnaissance Detachment
    - 525th Frontline Reconnaissance Detachment
- Northern Group (Colonel Klein – commander of the army war school, with the attached staff of the 391st Security Division):
  - emergency battalion from the 1st Fallschirm-Panzer Division Hermann Göring
  - emergency battalion from the 3rd SS Panzer Division Totenkopf
  - emergency battalion from the 5th SS Panzer Division Wiking
  - 183rd Security Battalion
  - emergency company of the army war school
  - emergency company from the 73rd Infantry Division
  - 500th Assault Engineer Battalion
  - 743rd Hetzer Assault Gun Detachment (without the 1st company)
  - six reconnaissance groups (each with three armored personnel carriers)
  - battery of light mortars
  - battery of heavy mortars
  - battery of 105mm infantry guns
  - six light anti-aircraft gun sections (from the 80th Anti-Aircraft Artillery Regiment)
- Southern Group (Major of the protective police Nachtwey – commander of the 34th Police Regiment):
  - II and III battalions of the 34th Police Regiment
  - 31st Schutzmannschaft Battalion of the SD (Ukrainian Legion of Self-Defense)
  - Cossack battalion
  - 737th Engineer-Construction Battalion
  - tank company from the 19th Panzer Division (if needed)
  - four reconnaissance groups from the 19th Panzer Division (each with three armored personnel carriers)
  - battery of infantry guns
  - six anti-aircraft gun sections from the 1st Parachute Panzer Division Hermann Göring
  - 23rd Machine Gun Battalion (with the permission of Army Group Centre)
  - 25th Machine Gun Battalion (with the permission of Army Group Center)

The Northern Group consisted of approximately 3,000 soldiers, while the Southern Group had about 2,800. The total strength designated to crush the Kampinos Group surpassed, both in terms of numbers and armaments, the structure of a regular infantry division, indicating the significant importance attached by the Germans to accomplishing this task.

On September 23, the command of the 9th Army informed the police commanders in Sochaczew and Łowicz, as well as the governors of the Warsaw, Radom, and Kraków districts, and the president of the Zichenau region about their plans. It was noted that Operation Sternschnuppe would cover the area between the Vistula and the Bzura rivers, as well as the Warsaw–Leszno–Kampinos–Brochów road. The police commanders were asked to cooperate in actions against the partisans, while the governor of the Warsaw district and the president of the Zichenau region were instructed, in cooperation with General Bernhardt, to evacuate the population from the areas affected by the operation, and then conduct a "selection" of the displaced people based on their ability to work.

The detailed plan of operations, developed by General Bernhardt, envisaged that in the first phase of the operation, German units would depart from their starting positions in the area of Dąbrowa Leśna–Łomianki–Dziekanów–Wólka Węglowa–Hornówek and by the end of the first day would reach the line of Palmiry–Pociecha–Truskaw–Buda. In the event of successful combat, it was planned to reach the line of Adamówek–eastern part of Janówek–forest clearing southeast of Janówek the same day (or the next day). In the second phase of the operation, the goal was to reach the line of Cybulice Duże–Sowia Wola–Borki–southern edge of Aleksandrów–Krogulec–Ławy. The aim of the third phase was to reach the line of Grabina–Kępiaste–Zaborówek. Simultaneously, the northern combat group was to secure the northern edge of the forest, while the southern group was to cover the Zaborów–Kampinos road section. For this purpose, the southern group was additionally assigned the collaborationist 308th Russian Battalion (Russische Battalion 308). The demarcation line between the two groups was to run along the Buraków–Janówek line.

On September 26, the staff of the 9th Army made some amendments to Bernhardt's plan. First, it was decided to divide the operation into two parts. The main assumptions of the final version of Operation Sternschnuppe's plan were as follows:

- The first part of the operation, consisting of three phases as envisioned by Bernhardt, was to last from 4 to 5 days. However, while the objectives set for the first and second phases of the operation remained essentially unchanged, the goals of the third phase were significantly expanded compared to the original plan. The intention was to reach the line of Helenówek–Nowa Dąbrowa–Nowe Budy–Leszno, while simultaneously securing the road of Leszno–Kampinos–Kistki (Sochaczew), as well as the Bzura riverbank from Kistki to Wyszogród. The aim of the first part of the action was thus to achieve freedom of movement east of the Błonie–Modlin line, as well as new supply routes for the SS IV Panzer Corps.
- The second part of the operation was intended to capture the entire central and western part of the Kampinos Forest in six phases. No time limit was set for the execution of this part of the operation.
- The Polish population residing in the Kampinos Forest area was to be deported to the Reich for forced labor with the help of the civil administration. An exception was to be made for the inhabitants of the villages that were part of the "Independent Republic of Kampinos". Their fate was not specified, but it could be assumed that they would be treated similarly to partisans.

Before midnight on September 26/27, the Chief of Staff of the 9th Army, General Helmut Staedke, sent the revised operation plan to the command of Army Group Center. That same night, the staff of the 391st Security Division handed over the command of the defense of the Vistula section in the Piaseczno area to the Hungarian 5th Reserve Division, after which it took over the duties of Colonel Klein's northern combat group headquarters.

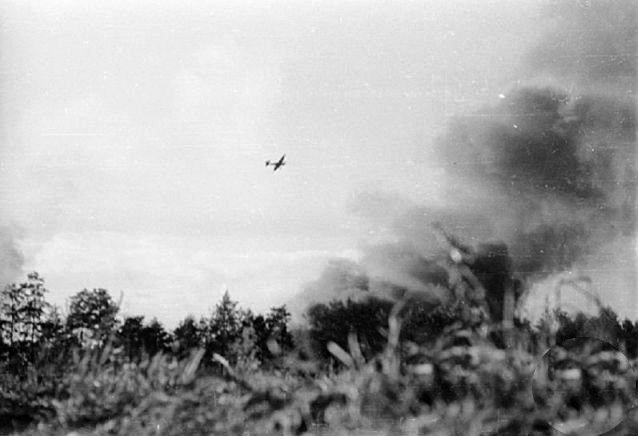
First day of Operation Sternschnuppe. German Air Force raid on the headquarters of the Kampinos Group command in Wiersze

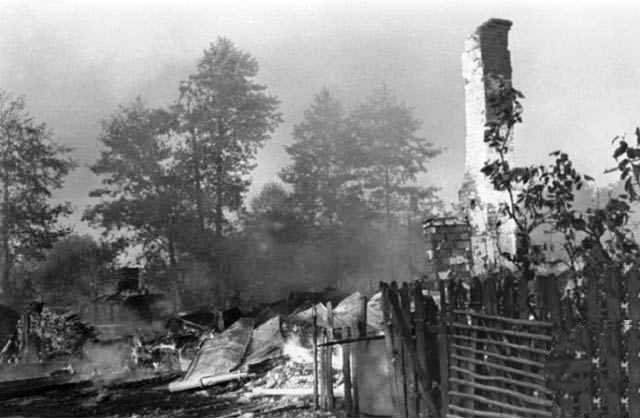
Wiersze burning after the German air raid (September 27, 1944)

On the morning of September 27, German Focke-Wulf Fw 189 Uhu reconnaissance aircraft conducted a detailed survey of the Wiersze area. Concerned by the enemy air activity, Lieutenant Strzała withdrew his infantry battalion from the village. His caution proved entirely justified, as around 3:45 PM, eight German Junkers Ju 87 dive bombers raided Wiersze. The German bombs destroyed a brick building that housed the headquarters of the Kampinos Group, and also demolished a radio station and an ammunition depot. The raid resulted in the deaths of two Polish soldiers (including a liaison officer) and wounded several others. Meanwhile, starting from the morning hours, German infantry supported by armored vehicles attacked Polish positions in Brzozówka, Janówek, Pociecha, Zaborów Leśny, and Łubiec. The initial assaults were not very vigorous and were repelled everywhere. However, the Germans repeatedly launched harassing attacks with the support of artillery, armored vehicles, and aircraft. After 3:00 PM, the enemy pressure began to increase significantly. The course of the battles fought that day by the Kampinos Group was as follows:

- Brzozówka was defended by soldiers of Lieutenant Znicz's Legion Battalion and the Zemsta Company under Lieutenant Porawa. Early in the morning, soldiers from Lieutenant Prawy's platoon (Zemsta Company) noticed that the village of Sowia Wola, located northeast of Brzozówka, had been occupied by German armored cars the previous night. A regular battle ensued, during which Porawa sent two more platoons to support Prawy. However, the Polish soldiers were unable to drive the Germans out of the village. Almost simultaneously, German infantry advancing from Małocice attacked Brzozówka and nearby positions. The first enemy attack was relatively weak and was repelled by the Home Army soldiers. In the afternoon, however, the Germans resumed their assault, this time with the support of armored vehicles and artillery shelling from Kazuń and Małocice. Around 6:20 PM, Brzozówka was also bombed by German dive bombers, causing significant casualties in the Legion Battalion. Ultimately, the Polish soldiers managed to hold their positions. Reports also indicated the destruction of a German tank. Józef Krzyczkowski estimated that eight Polish soldiers were killed and five wounded in the battles near Brzozówka and Sowia Wola, while German losses were three killed and seven wounded.
- Janówek, the easternmost outpost of the Kampinos Group, was defended by an infantry platoon from Captain Wilhelm Kosiński's (codenamed Mścisław) company (Major Korwin's Sochaczew Battalion) and a cavalry platoon from the Palmiry-Młociny Regiment. German forces launched an assault there almost simultaneously with the attack on Brzozówka. Supported by ten armored vehicles, the German infantry soon pushed back the Polish defenses. Alarmed by the unfavorable course of the battle, Major Korwin ordered Captain Mścisław to immediately support the defenders of Janówek with his remaining two platoons. At the same time, Lieutenant Dolina supported Mścisław's soldiers with a captured 75 mm gun. Facing the enemy's superior firepower, Mścisław decided to occupy the hills in a nearby forest, avoiding combat in the village buildings or adjacent meadows. The Polish gunfire temporarily halted the German armored vehicle advance. For several hours, the Polish soldiers held their positions under heavy enemy fire. Józef Krzyczkowski estimated that four Polish soldiers were killed and seven wounded in the battle at Janówek, while German losses were four killed and four wounded. German reports described the battle for Janówek as one of the day's toughest engagements.
- Pociecha was defended by Lieutenant Nawrot's infantry company from Major Korwin's Sochaczew Battalion and a platoon from the 3rd Squadron of the 27th Uhlan Regiment, commanded by Platoon Sergeant Antoni Burdziełowski (codenamed Wir). Around noon, the Polish outpost was attacked by German infantry supported by three tanks. Despite significant losses, the Poles managed to repel the initial German attacks. In the evening, however, the Germans pushed the defenders of Pociecha back about 2 km from their original positions. An attempt to recapture the lost positions failed under German artillery fire. Nevertheless, the Poles maintained positions in the forest north of the village. Józef Krzyczkowski estimated that five Polish soldiers were killed and four wounded in the battle at Pociecha, while German losses were two killed and three wounded.
- Zaborów Leśny was defended by the Jerzyki Company. In the afternoon, the village was attacked by German armored vehicles supported by a small number of infantry. The German attacks were cautious and failed to dislodge the Jerzyki from their positions. Józef Krzyczkowski estimated that two Polish soldiers were wounded in the fighting at Zaborów, while German losses were one killed and two wounded.

German reports indicated that Sternschnuppe units encountered only sporadic resistance that day. Larger battles reportedly occurred only in the areas of Palmiry and Janówek. During the latter skirmish, the Germans claimed to have stormed a fortified position on a hill. German losses were estimated at four killed (including three Cossacks) and nine wounded, with 14 partisans killed and 140 civilians captured. The commanders of both German combat groups believed that all objectives planned for the first day of the operation were achieved. (Note: German reports indicated that they managed to reach the line: Czeczotki–southern edge of Małocice–western edge of Łosia Wólka–Janówek (northern group), as well as Pociecha–area 1 km from Truskaw–Zaborów Leśny estate (southern group) (Sawicki (2010, p. 159)).) The Germans significantly overestimated the strength of the Kampinos Group, which resulted in relatively cautious assaults on September 27 and did not lead to a significant breakthrough in the Polish defense. This fact greatly facilitated the withdrawal of Polish units from the Kampinos Forest.

== Withdrawal of Home Army units from Kampinos Forest ==
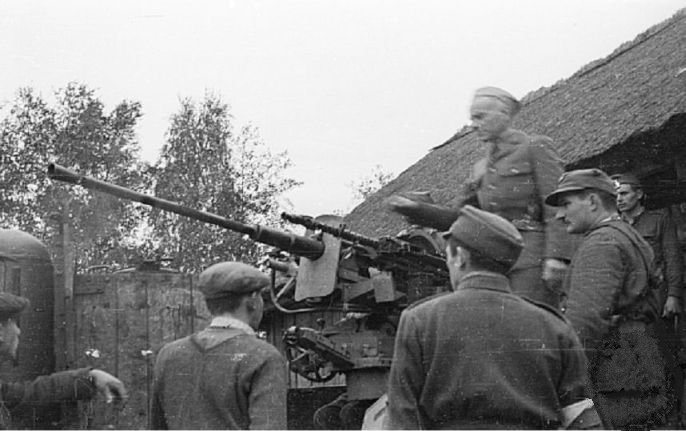
Major Okoń addressing soldiers before the departure from Kampinos

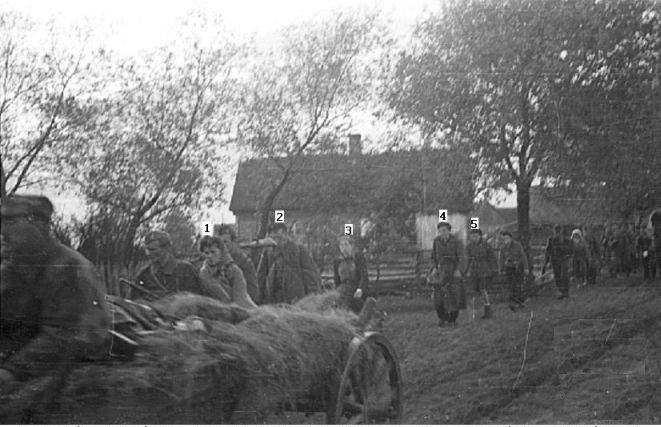
Soldiers of the Air Company under Lieutenant Lawa during the retreat from Kampinos Forest

Major Okoń quickly realized that the German actions were only the prelude to a large-scale operation aimed at breaking up the Kampinos Group. After the first German air raid, he withdrew the main forces of the group to the forests south of Wiersze, Brzozówka, and Truskawka. He also decided to immediately start preparations for the group's "leap" to the western part of the Kampinos Forest. From there, Kampinos Group was to break through to the forests south of Żyrardów (Puszcza Mariańska and neighboring forest complexes) and then move under their cover to the Świętokrzyskie Mountains. Officers who assessed that their units would not withstand the hardships of the march and the upcoming battles were instructed by Okoń to disband their soldiers and send them home. (Note: Some sources state that Okoń announced these decisions to his officers during a meeting convened on the afternoon of September 27, or even in the morning (Gozdawa-Gołębiowski (1992, p. 477); Bielecki & Kulesza (1996, p. 445); Krzyczkowski (1962, p. 452)). However, some officers maintained years later that, in reality, no such meeting took place and that Okoń made all the decisions independently without informing his officers of the details of his plan (Nowak (2011, p. 124); Pilch (2013, p. 241)).) In line with previous announcements, Major Korwin decided to demobilize his soldiers and return to underground activity. (Note: The disbanding of the Sochaczew Battalion took place on the night of September 27/28. Some soldiers, under the command of Major Korwin himself, marched westward towards Sochaczew. Another group, led by Second Lieutenant Mazur, headed south towards Szymanów. Some soldiers opted to continue fighting and were incorporated into other units of the Kampinos Group (Gozdawa-Gołębiowski (1992, p. 478); Nowak (2011, p. 125)).) Second Lieutenant Teoch also decided to disband his unit, instructing soldiers and party activists to individually make their way to the Grójec area. Lieutenant Jerzy decided that the Jerzyki company would continue fighting, only sending sick and physically weak soldiers to the Milanówek and Pruszków areas.

At 10:00 PM, all outposts received orders to disengage from the enemy and join the forming column in Wiersze. Around 11:00 PM, the several-kilometer-long column set off westward. The march route led along forest roads near Roztoka, Grabina, and Zamość. At the head of the column marched Major Okoń with the cavalry vanguard under the command of Lieutenant Zygmunt Koc (codenamed Dąbrowa). Next came the infantry, supply wagons, and part of the cavalry. The rearguard was made up of the 3rd squadron under Warrant Officer Narcyz, accompanied by Lieutenant Dolina. Many civilian refugees joined the departing soldiers that night, gradually separating from the group along the way to seek shelter with relatives and friends. The column also included a group of between 100 and 150 German prisoners.

Years later, veterans and chroniclers of the group were highly critical of Major Okoń's actions related to the withdrawal from Kampinos Forest. The retreat to the Świętokrzyskie Mountains had been considered for some time, but the commander of Kampinos Group failed to send the dozens of wounded and sick soldiers to a safe place in advance. He also did not reduce the enormous supply train, which included from 200 to 350 wagons filled with food, ammunition, equipment, documents, and often personal items. The soldiers were also unnecessarily burdened with additional ammunition supplies. Additionally, Okoń neglected to conduct detailed reconnaissance of the march route and did not inform his officers of the planned route. Managing the march of such a large and heavily laden group was a significant challenge, but Okoń did not have his own cavalry escort or personal staff, and he even sent back the platoon of couriers from the 2nd squadron provided by Lieutenant Dolina. Under these conditions, the night march along sandy forest roads was very slow and exceptionally arduous. Frequent bottlenecks were caused mainly by overloaded supply wagons. Ultimately, after an all-night march covering more than 20 km, the Polish column arrived in the vicinity of the village of Bieliny in the morning. There, Okoń ordered a full day of rest.

Meanwhile, the Germans continued Operation Falling Star. On September 28, their units, cautiously advancing into the forest, moved from 4 to 6 km westward and reached the line: Stare Grochale–Aleksandrów–Kiścinne–Roztoka–Krogulec–Ławy. However, due to the withdrawal of the Kampinos Group, the German attack hit a void. The Sternschnuppe units could only report killing 12 partisans and detaining 36 civilians. German losses – mainly caused by mines left by Home Army soldiers – amounted to three dead and four wounded. Thanks to reports from agents and information provided by captured civilians, the German command realized that the Polish group had begun a retreat. Suspecting that the partisans were heading to the western part of the Kampinos Forest, preparations were made to intercept the Polish group at the Bzura line, while simultaneously directing motorized reconnaissance groups to monitor the roads leading from the forest southward. However, the agents' reports were so inaccurate and contradictory that the German command still lacked reliable information on the direction of the Polish retreat and the location of the Kampinos Group. (Note: The Germans were convinced that Okoń's units had only reached Nowe Budy or possibly Górki. Agents provided misleading information about allegedly observing three Polish guns near Krubiczew and "four small tanks" near Teofile. There were also reports that part of the Polish forces had moved to the Kromnowski Forest in the northwestern part of the Kampinos Forest (Sawicki (2010, pp. 160–161)).) This, along with the rather modest progress of Operation Sternschnuppe so far, allowed the Kampinos Group nearly a full day of rest near Bieliny.

On the afternoon of September 28, a staff briefing for the Kampinos Group took place in Bieliny. It was decided to break through to the south, not directly from Bieliny but rather from a more eastern route. As a result, the Polish units had to retreat to the village of Zamczysko, nearly 8 km away, and from there proceed along side-roads southward, passing the western edge of Czarnów and Łuszczewek. This route allowed them to avoid German fortifications and the marshy meadows north of the village of Kampinos. However, it was clear that retreating southwards would essentially be impossible without fighting, as the Kampinos Group had to break through enemy outposts on the route from Leszno to Kampinos, and then cross three busy highways (Warsaw–Sochaczew, Warsaw–Żyrardów via Grodzisk, and Warsaw–Żyrardów via Nadarzyn) and two railway lines – all heavily guarded by the Germans. The march on the night of September 27/28 demonstrated how burdensome the extensive supply wagons were for the Polish units. Nevertheless, Major Okoń had brusquely rejected all suggestions from his officers regarding sending away the wounded and reducing the number of supply wagons. He also did not allow any grassroots initiative in this regard. The course of this discussion was presented somewhat differently by Okoń's adjutant, Corporal Lucjan Wiśniewski, codenamed Sęp, who claimed that Lieutenant Dolina was the most vigorous in protesting against abandoning the supply wagons, arguing that he had brought them all the way from the Naliboki Forest, and the equipment on the carts might be useful in future operations. Regardless of who supported keeping the supply wagons, this decision, according to Józef Krzyczkowski, largely determined the subsequent defeat of the Kampinos Group.

On September 28, around 4:00 or 5:00 PM, the Kampinos Group resumed its march. The vanguard consisted of the 2nd and 4th Cavalry Squadrons, accompanied by Major Okoń and Captain Nieczaj. They were followed by the airborne company of Lieutenant Lawa, the infantry battalion of Lieutenant Strzała, the machine gun squadron, the captured gun commanded by Second Lieutenant Leszczyc, soldiers of the Sochaczew and Legionowo battalions, and the Zemsta company. The rear guard was formed by the 1st and 3rd Cavalry Squadrons under the command of Sergeant Narcyz, supported by infantry from the Jerzyki company. The flanks of the column were protected by mounted reconnaissance platoons. According to Lieutenant Dolina, the march was poorly organized, and in the dark of night and unfamiliar terrain, it was extremely difficult to maintain the cohesion of the column. However, the Germans still did not know the location of the Kampinos Group, so the unit managed to reach Zamczysko without incident. There, the column turned right, heading towards Wróblewo, Korfowe, Powązki, and Wilków – towards Czarnków. Around 11:30 PM, the vanguard reached the road connecting Leszno with Kampinos near the village of Wiejca. The Polish soldiers broke through the cordon formed by the collaborationist 308th Russian Battalion with relative ease. However, the column had to cross the road under fire from the alerted German artillery. German reports later indicated that the anti-aircraft artillery fire caused significant losses in the Polish units. Polish veterans, however, recalled that the Germans fired almost blindly, and the effectiveness of the fire was minimal. Meanwhile, the column continued marching southward. After covering about three kilometers, Major Okoń ordered a stop, instructing the soldiers to leave some of the wounded and sick in the buildings of the estate in Gawartowa Wola and the hospital in Łuszczewek. This decision was undoubtedly correct, albeit belated. The commander of the Kampinos Group also ordered the search for a local guide. However, the first guide did not appeal to Okoń for unknown reasons, so the soldiers had to find another. In this way, at least 45 minutes of valuable time was lost. Meanwhile, the Germans, alarmed by the fight near Wiejca, had already dispatched a pursuit force against the Kampinos Group units. This pursuit likely included several armored personnel carriers from reconnaissance groups patrolling the area as part of Operation Sternschnuppe, and truck-loaded soldiers of the 308th Battalion, possibly supported by the mounted reconnaissance group Widder.

Less than an hour after resuming their march, the Polish column reached a small wooden bridge over the Utrata river near Łuszczewek. As the infantry and cavalry had already crossed to the other side and the convoy was preparing to cross, the rear guard was unexpectedly attacked by several German armored vehicles. Most witnesses described these vehicles as "tanks", but they were likely Sd.Kfz. 251 armored personnel carriers belonging to one of the German reconnaissance groups. Deprived of anti-tank weapons, the 1st Squadron quickly scattered after brief resistance. The convoy was thrown into chaos, with the transporters breaking formation and attempting to save themselves independently. Some carts tried to ford the Utrata and got stuck in the reeds or river mud, while one temporarily blocked the wooden bridge.

At this point, the Jerzyki company engaged the German pursuit, and Dolina sent the 3rd Squadron under Sergeant Narcyz to assist them. The cavalrymen galloped across the "safe" side of the Utrata, where they left their horses, then returned on foot to fight. The convoy misinterpreted this maneuver as a retreat, which temporarily increased the panic. Meanwhile, the Jerzyki, pressured by the enemy, gradually retreated toward the bridge. During the fight, Lieutenant Jerzy was captured after being injured. In this difficult moment, however, the lancers of Narcyz managed to slow the German assault with their PIAT anti-tank weapons. Despite losing part of the convoy and suffering significant casualties among the rear guard, the Polish column managed to complete the crossing to the other side of the Utrata. The Germans did not continue their pursuit, probably fearing that the wooden bridge would not support the weight of their vehicles and that fording the river under fire from Polish PIATs would be too risky. According to German reports, the Kampinos Group lost 39 killed, 14 captured, 5 mortars, 5 medium machine guns, 7 light machine guns, 2 Panzerfausts, one submachine gun, 90 rifles, pistols, and many ammunition and explosives. The Germans captured or destroyed 91 wagons, seized 66 horses, and killed another 95. The Poles also lost their only 75 mm gun, which was abandoned and blown up during the retreat. (Note: German reports did indeed state that the Poles suffered the aforementioned losses while breaking through the cordon near Wiejca. However, it appears that these losses primarily refer to the battle at the Utrata river, or possibly to both engagements (Nowak (2011, p. 134)).) Józef Krzyczkowski, however, estimated that during the fighting near Łuszczewek, the Polish units lost 20 killed and 10 wounded, while German casualties were 5 killed and 10 wounded.

Meanwhile, the Polish column, urged on by Okoń's orders, continued its rapid march southward. The units of the Kampinos Group managed to cross the Warsaw–Sochaczew highway without much difficulty. The lancers of the 2nd squadron, who were at the vanguard, surprised and destroyed a German supply column, demolishing several vehicles. At around 3:30 AM, the Polish column crossed the Warsaw–Sochaczew railway line near the village of Seroki-Parcela, engaging in a brief skirmish with German alert units. The march was not without challenges – there were frequent disruptions in the formation, causing bottlenecks, and Lieutenant Dolina along with other officers struggled to maintain order within the column. Throughout the night, individual soldiers and small groups continually broke away from the column, seeking safety on their own.

At dawn on September 29, the vanguard reached the village of Stanisławów, where a unit of Hungarian cavalry was stationed. Although allied with the Germans, the Hungarians welcomed the Home Army soldiers warmly and not only did not hinder their march but even supplied the Poles with food, some ammunition, and grenades. Between Stanisławów and Basin, the Home Army soldiers unexpectedly encountered another German supply column, which they easily overran.

Meanwhile, Major Okoń ordered a reorganization – he directed the entire cavalry to move to the front of the column, while the rearguard was to be taken over by Lieutenant Jurek's company from Sochaczew (due to his injury, command was assumed by Second Lieutenant Józef Regulski, codenamed Biały, the former organizer of the drop-reception base). Overall command of the rearguard was held by Lieutenant Dolina. It was likely around 8:00 AM when the rearguard units marching near the villages of Stanisławów and Baranów were attacked by German armored vehicles. A fight ensued, but initially, the Germans did not attack too vigorously, limiting themselves to firing at the Polish soldiers from a safe distance. The shelling caused casualties among the men and the supply wagons. Around 9:45 AM, reinforced German forces renewed their attack, forcing the soldiers of the Sochaczew company and the lancers of the 3rd squadron to retreat from Baranów. During the retreat, Second Lieutenant Biały was captured. Some stragglers and remaining supply wagons in the village also fell into German hands. Józef Krzyczkowski estimated that 15 Polish soldiers were killed and another 6 wounded in the battle at Baranów. Due to the losses suffered during the night of September 28/29, and because individual soldiers and small subunits continued to break away from the main column, the Kampinos Group had dwindled to around 1,200 soldiers by this time.

== Destruction of the Kampinos Group near Jaktorów ==
On the early morning of September 29, the vanguard of the Polish column reached the railway tracks of the Warsaw–Żyrardów line. Near the village of Budy Zosine, the lancers captured an enemy supply wagon, taking several German soldiers prisoner. Warrant Officer Jan Łowicki, codenamed Łotysz, commander of the 1st platoon in the 2nd squadron, reported to Major Okoń that only a few enemy soldiers were guarding the tracks. However, the commander of the Kampinos Group did not agree to launch an attack and ordered Łotysz to return to the main forces of the squadron. Around 7:00 AM, the main forces of the Polish group reached a distance of approximately 300–500 m from the railway line. At this point, Major Okoń unexpectedly ordered a several-hour halt, instructing the troops to have a meal, set up security, and, as far as possible, position the units under the cover of the small alder carr present in the area. The commander wanted to allow the soldiers to rest and use the halt to reorganize the column. The break in the march was also intended to allow stragglers and the rearguard fighting at Baranów to join the main forces of the Kampinos Group.

The rank-and-file soldiers, exhausted from the night battle and the forced march, were very pleased with the decision to halt. However, some officers were concerned about Okoń's decision. They were aware that the Germans already knew the direction of the Kampinos Group's retreat. The gunfire in the Baranów area and the appearance of a German reconnaissance aircraft over the main forces of the group suggested that the German pursuit could be expected soon. Engaging in a fight was highly inadvisable since the Kampinos Group's resting place consisted of extensive marshy meadows, dotted with a small alder carr – a terrain very difficult to defend and favorable to the Germans with their superior firepower. (Note: Nor could the scattered buildings of the village of Budy Zosine provide cover for the Polish soldiers ({[Harvard citation text|Krzyczkowski|1962|p=468}}).) Meanwhile, the distance from Budy Zosine to the Radziejowicki Forest on the other side of the tracks was only 6 km. The officers believed that the soldiers could make one final effort and cross the railway line. However, Okoń stubbornly stuck to his decision, angrily rejecting all the advice of his subordinates. He did not even secure the passage over the embankment or blow up the railway tracks. When the chaplain of the Palmiry-Młociny Regiment, Father Jerzy Baszkiewicz, codenamed Radwan II, tried to persuade Okoń to cross the tracks immediately, Okoń insulted the priest and threatened to shoot him on the spot. However, Okoń allowed Lieutenant Lawa's air company to detach from the group and cross the tracks independently. Lawa, leaving Major Kurs's drop platoon in Budy Zosine, directed the rest of his company to the village of Rozłogi, then took a roundabout route, experiencing many difficulties along the way, but crossed the railway line without losses the next day. Individual soldiers and small groups of partisans also began to separate from the main group.

Thanks to reports from agents, alerts from units engaged in the night fight, and information obtained from captured Home Army soldiers, the German command realized that Major Okoń intended to retreat through the Żyrardów and Skierniewice forests towards the Świętokrzyskie Mountains. Since most of the units participating in Operation Sternschnuppe were too far away, the Germans began organizing an improvised combat group. Its individual units were transferred in an emergency to Żyrardów with the task of forming a blockade line before the town, then surrounding and destroying the Polish group. To fight the Kampinos Group, the German command deployed primarily the 70th Grenadier Regiment of the 73rd Infantry Division, a guard battalion (probably the aforementioned 308th Russian Battalion), alarm units from the Żyrardów and Grodzisk Mazowiecki garrisons, two companies of armored personnel carriers, a tank platoon, and armored train No. 30. From the north, units of the Bernard group under Colonel König's command (these were the units that had fought the rearguard of the Polish group on the morning of September 29) were sent to Baranów. The German units directed to Żyrardów numbered about 2,000 soldiers and nearly 40 armored vehicles (mainly armored personnel carriers, as well as a few tanks). They also had air support.

At around 10:00 AM, the rear guard, led by Lieutenant Dolina, joined the main forces of the Kampinos Group. Around the same time, another German reconnaissance aircraft, an Fw 189, began circling over the Polish group. After several passes, the pilot lowered the altitude and began strafing the Polish soldiers with onboard weaponry, causing significant casualties and inducing panic among the partisan mounts. In response, the Polish soldiers opened fire intensely; one officer even fired a TT pistol. On the third or fourth pass, the German plane unexpectedly caught fire and crashed, causing great enthusiasm among the soldiers. Adam Borkiewicz reported that the German aircraft was shot down by a well-aimed burst from a light machine gun by Second Lieutenant Andrzej Połoński, codenamed Hlebowicz, although this information cannot be verified.

Meanwhile, around 11:00 AM, Major Okoń finally decided to start the breakout across the tracks. According to the plan he presented to his officers during a meeting in Budy Zosine, the Polish group was to be divided into two columns. Lieutenant Strzała's infantry battalion was to secure the railway tracks near the crossing in Budy Zosine, then hold the Żyrardów–Grodzisk road and maintain the corridor thus created until the wagons and remaining infantry units had passed. Simultaneously, the second column, which included all the cavalry and the Kampinos Group's headquarters, was to cross the tracks via the railway crossing in Międzyborów, about 1.5 km away. (Note: Not far from Międzyborów stretched on both sides of the tracks a small forest overgrowing low hills, called Black Borek. This was potentially the most convenient place to cross the railroad (Krzyczkowski (1962, p. 469)).) The group's re-concentration was to occur in Puszcza Mariańska.

At approximately 12:00 PM, Strzała's battalion began its attack on the railway crossing. Initially, the attack went well for the Polish side. Strzała's soldiers, covered by intense fire from Second Lieutenant Olsza's HMG company, pushed the German infantry to the other side of the railway embankment, reaching close to the tracks. About 30 soldiers from Platoon Leader Hipolit Tumiłowicz's platoon from Sergeant Opończa's company managed to break through to the other side of the embankment. A group of soldiers from Second Lieutenant Zetes' company (from Cadet Officer Janusz Warmiński's platoon, codenamed Murzyn, and Corporal Art's squad) also seemed to succeed in breaking through. At this point, when victory seemed near, a turning point occurred. A German armored train appeared on the tracks from Żyrardów. Most sources describe it as an armored train, but Szymon Nowak, relying on participants' accounts, claims it was actually an "improvised mobile battery" carrying several Panzer IV tanks and armored personnel carriers on open flat wagons. Strzała's battalion, attacking across an open plain, was quickly pinned down and decimated by the intense fire from the tanks and machine guns. The Polish soldiers tried to respond with PIAT grenade launchers, but their shots did little damage to the German vehicles. An unequal fight was also engaged by the crew of a captured 20mm gun under the command of Second Lieutenant Leszczyc. After only a few shots, the gun was destroyed. Meanwhile, the armored train crew, having halted the Polish infantry's advance, shifted their fire to the wagons, causing enormous losses among the vehicles and horses.

After the attack collapsed, the decimated Strzała's battalion withdrew to their starting positions. The Kampinos Group's units then took defensive positions in the shape of a large quadrangle, relying primarily on the natural obstacles in the area. Part of Strzała's infantry occupied a drainage ditch running along the eastern side of Budy Zosine, while the rest of the battalion, positioned some distance from the railway line, formed a defensive line on the southern flank of the Polish group. Strzała's battalion was reinforced by an HMG squadron from the 23rd Uhlan Regiment and the remnants of the 1st squadron from the 27th Uhlan Regiment. The northern flank, from Baranów's direction, was occupied by Lieutenant Znicz's Legion Battalion. The western flank, from Żyrardów's direction, was secured by dismounted lancers from the 2nd, 3rd, and 4th squadrons. They occupied drainage ditches and blocked the road running parallel to the tracks. The remaining subunits and wagons were inside the quadrangle. Meanwhile, the Polish soldiers released a group of between 100 and 150 German prisoners. The encirclement was not yet complete, as the Germans had not yet occupied the eastern and western edges of the forming pocket. Thus, there was still a chance that, with energetic leadership and at the cost of abandoning the wagons, the Kampinos Group could avoid destruction. However, Major Okoń remained passive. He likely intended to hold the defensive positions until dusk, then attempt to break through towards the northwest from Żyrardów. Other senior officers of the group, including the previously very energetic and proactive Lieutenant Dolina, also remained passive, probably demoralized by the course of the battle and Major Okoń's conduct.

Meanwhile, the Germans, taking advantage of the passivity of the Polish command, closed the encirclement around the Kampinos Group. Around 2:00 PM, German infantry supported by armored vehicles attacked the Kampinos Group's positions – first from the direction of Jaktorów, then from Żyrardów. The Polish units, crowded in an area of less than 6 km^{2}, were bombarded by German artillery, causing significant casualties among both soldiers and horses. German tanks systematically destroyed Polish positions, gradually breaking the cohesive defensive line into isolated pockets of resistance. Enemy aircraft also appeared over the battlefield. Despite the shelling and heavy losses, the Polish resistance remained strong. On the western flank, the 4th squadron, supported by an additional PIAT sent by Dolina, repelled the German tank attack. The German vehicles then turned slightly east, attacking Strzała's battalion positions. The defenders, sheltered by the high banks of a dried-up pond, withstood the attack. One of the tanks was immobilized by a well-aimed PIAT shot from Platoon Leader Aleksander Pawluczenko, while another vehicle was damaged and forced to retreat. Shortly afterward, however, increasing enemy pressure and a lack of anti-tank ammunition forced the Polish soldiers to retreat. Platoon Leader Pawluczenko was killed (seriously wounded, he committed suicide to avoid capture). Meanwhile, the 3rd squadron repelled German attacks from the direction of Żyrardów. The Germans were unable to penetrate the Polish positions on any front.

Around 4:00 PM, Major Okoń changed his previous orders, instructing Lieutenant Strzała to attempt to break the encirclement towards the northwest from Żyrardów. (Note: During preparations for the assault, Lieutenant Strzała was wounded. A group of soldiers from his battalion, returning on their own to the Kampinos Forest, escorted him to the hospital in Łuszczewek (Podgóreczny (2010, p. 197)).) The remaining units of the Kampinos Group were to follow Strzała's infantry. Simultaneously, for reasons still unclear, Okoń ordered Lieutenant Porawa to organize an attack by the Zemsta Company in almost the opposite direction towards the railway line (the major planned to personally participate in this attack). Remembering the outcome of the first assault, Porawa considered a daytime attack to be suicidal. Okoń then decided to lead the attack himself with the II and III platoons of the Zemsta Company, leaving the I platoon with Porawa as the rearguard. Ultimately, the attack to the south did not materialize, as an armed German train reappeared on the tracks, supported additionally by the arrival of armored train No. 30 from Warsaw (reinforced by an infantry landing). Heavy fire from both trains pinned the Zemsta Company on their starting positions. The order to attack northwest caused chaos in the Polish defense lines, as some units moved to attack positions while others continued to defend their current positions. Around 5:00 PM, Major Okoń, located near the 2nd squadron's positions, went to the rear to ensure ammunition delivery to the front-line units. This was the last time he was seen alive. The next day, the body of the Kampinos Group commander was found on the battlefield. The circumstances of Major Okoń's death are unknown i t is suspected that, devastated by the defeat, he might have committed suicide or was shot by one of his subordinates blaming him for the group's downfall. Szymon Nowak leaned towards the latter version, citing a "conspiracy of silence" by chroniclers and veterans of the Kampinos Group regarding the major's death.

From this moment, the Kampinos Group ceased to function as an organized combat group. Throughout the late afternoon and evening, individual units continued to fight, trying to hold out until dusk and then break out of the German encirclement. Most soldiers attempted to break through to the southwest, while some tried to return to the Kampinos Forest. Lieutenant Dolina gathered an improvised unit around him and, with a fierce assault, broke through two German lines, losing several soldiers along the way. By dawn, Dolina managed to reach Puszcza Mariańska with 53 infantrymen and cavalrymen. Around 6:00 PM, from 200 to 300 lancers from the 1st, 2nd, and 4th squadrons, led by Captain Nieczaj, launched a violent cavalry charge towards the village of Grądy (western edge of the encirclement). Only from 140 to 200 lancers made it to the village; among those left on the battlefield were the wounded Captain Nieczaj and the 2nd squadron commander, Senior Sergeant Lawina (captured). Major Bronisław Lewkowicz, codenamed Kurs, then took command of the cavalrymen. After a two-hour rest in Grądy, the cavalrymen resumed their march, but upon crossing the Wiskitki–Oryszew road, they unexpectedly encountered a German outpost. The night firefight scattered the Polish unit (Senior Sergeant Wołodyjowski, the 1st squadron commander, was captured). Major Kurs, with about 60 lancers, continued the retreat towards Puszcza Mariańska. After bypassing Żyrardów from the west, they crossed the railway tracks and joined Dolina's unit on September 30. The retreat of the 4th squadron's lancers, led by Second Lieutenant Aleksander Pietrucki, codenamed Jawor, was unusual. During the first charge, the lancers, trying to bypass the German positions, separated from the main force and found themselves on the outskirts of Żyrardów. With no other choice, Jawor's lancers galloped through the deserted city's streets, then headed back to the Kampinos Forest.

After Dolina left and the cavalry charge took place, any organized defense became impossible. The German troops no longer faced significant difficulties in penetrating the Polish defenses. Many partisans managed to disperse in the area under the cover of darkness and escape the encirclement on their own. They later found help and shelter among the civilian population and local Home Army structures. However, some Polish soldiers continued to fight. The daily reports of the 9th Army indicate that skirmishes with partisans were still ongoing around 10:50 PM in the area northeast of Żyrardów. In one of the drainage ditches, the 3rd squadron, left on the battlefield by Captain Nieczaj to cover the charge of the remaining squadrons, defended itself for several hours. The fighting in this sector was very intense, including hand-to-hand combat. During an attempt to break through, the squadron commander, Warrant Officer Narcyz, was killed. Ultimately, a group of about 50 cavalrymen broke through the German cordon and bypassed Żyrardów from the north. After midnight, the soldiers finally found themselves outside the encirclement. A similar route was taken by a group of about 90 soldiers from the Legion Battalion and the Zemsta Company, led by Second Lieutenant Mieczysław Szarek, codenamed Czcibor. Under the cover of night, the unit crossed the road from Wiskitki to Żyrardów unnoticed and, after leaving about 20 wounded in the villages of Feliksów and Kozłowice, reached the forests west of Żyrardów by the morning of September 30. Under the cover of the Marian Forest, Czcibor's group crossed the Pilica river after a few days. Meanwhile, a group of about 60 soldiers under the command of Lieutenant Dąbrowa, consisting mainly of infantrymen from the 2nd Company of the II Battalion under Lieutenant Strzała, repelled an attack by Russian or Ukrainian collaborators after dark and then broke through towards the southwest. During the retreat, this unit dispersed into smaller groups. Many other groups were broken up by the Germans or suffered heavy losses while attempting to escape the encirclement.

On September 30 at 6:30 AM, the Germans resumed clearing the encirclement. According to preserved German reports, 8 Polish partisans were killed and 11 taken prisoner in the vicinity of the village of Seroki-Parcela. However, there were no more Polish soldiers detected on the battlefield around Budy Zosine.

== Battle report ==
The Battle of Jaktorów was likely the largest partisan battle fought during World War II on Polish territory west of the Vistula river. As a result, the Kampinos Group was destroyed and ceased to pose a threat to the rear of the German 9th Army. Polish and German sources provide conflicting information regarding the losses suffered by the Polish formation that day. (Note: Kirchmayer (1984, p. 449) estimated the Polish losses at Jaktorów to be about 100 killed, about 200 wounded, and about 100 taken prisoner. Krzyczkowski (1962, pp. 500, 520) estimated that 150 Polish soldiers were killed, 30 were wounded, and 150 were taken prisoner. Koszada (2007, pp. 92–93) reported that about 150 Polish soldiers were killed, over 200 were wounded, and about 200 were taken prisoner. Pilch (2013, p. 260), on the other hand, claimed that the Polish formation's losses reached 250 killed, nearly 200 wounded, and about 300 taken prisoner. Lieutenant Wolfgang Weller, in his preliminary notes for the German 9th Army's war diary, estimated the number of partisans killed at Jaktorów to be around 400. Similar data also appeared in the daily report of Army Group Center, but they were not repeated in the counterintelligence report or the 9th Army's daily report. Later German reports mentioned taking 150 prisoners and inflicting "very high" casualties in killed and wounded on the Polish formation (Sawicki (2010, pp. 168–169)).) Probably the most reliable estimates are by Adam Borkiewicz, who estimated that the losses of the Kampinos Group in the Battle of Jaktorów amounted to between 150 and 200 killed, about 120 wounded, and 150 taken prisoner. The Polish formation also lost most of its horses, almost all heavy weaponry, wagons, and supplies of equipment and ammunition.

Jerzy Koszada was able to determine the names of 183 soldiers of the Kampinos Group who died on 29/30 September 1944 in the area of Budy Zosine, Jaktorów, and Żyrardów. Among them was the group's commander, Major Alfons Kotowski, codenamed Okoń. Among the higher-ranking officers killed were: Lieutenant Franciszek Wiszniowski, codenamed Jurek (commander of the company from Wiersze), Lieutenant Władysław Ludwig, codenamed Kamil (deputy commander of the Zemsta Company), Lieutenant Jan Raczkowski, codenamed Motor (commander of the 5th company in the Legionowo battalion), and Warrant Officer Narcyz Kulikowski, codenamed Narcyz (commander of the 3rd squadron). Those who were taken prisoner by the Germans included: Second Lieutenant Józef Regulski, codenamed Biały (commander of the drop and reception base, captured near Baranów), Senior Warrant Officer Jan Jakubowski, codenamed Wołodyjowski (commander of the 1st squadron), Senior Warrant Officer Józef Niedźwiecki, codenamed Lawina (commander of the 2nd squadron), and Lieutenant Jerzy Strzałkowski, codenamed Jerzy (commander of the Jerzyki company, captured in a night battle over Utrata).

Probably between 10 and 28 wounded or captured soldiers of the Kampinos Group were murdered by the enemy immediately after the battle (one of them was Lieutenant Motor). The crimes against prisoners were mainly committed by formations composed of SS men, Ordnungspolizei, gendarmes, and Russian and Ukrainian collaborators. Most of the prisoners, especially those captured by Wehrmacht soldiers, were treated according to the international humanitarian law. Lieutenant Dolina stated in his post-war memoirs that one group of prisoners was saved from execution by German soldiers previously released from Polish captivity. There were also cases when Polish soldiers were saved by Hungarian cavalrymen from a unit in Stanisławów or by Wehrmacht soldiers (among the latter were many Poles forcibly conscripted into the German army). Late in the morning of September 30, a column of 150 Polish prisoners was brought to Żyrardów. Wehrmacht officers then refused to hand over captured Polish officers to Gestapo officials. After a two-day stay in Żyrardów, the prisoners were transported by train to Skierniewice, where the Germans organized a temporary camp for Warsaw insurgents.

The losses suffered by the Germans in the Battle of Jaktorów probably amounted to between 100 and 150 killed and wounded. Polish soldiers also managed to shoot down an Fw 189 reconnaissance aircraft and destroy or damage several German armored vehicles.

== Aftermath ==
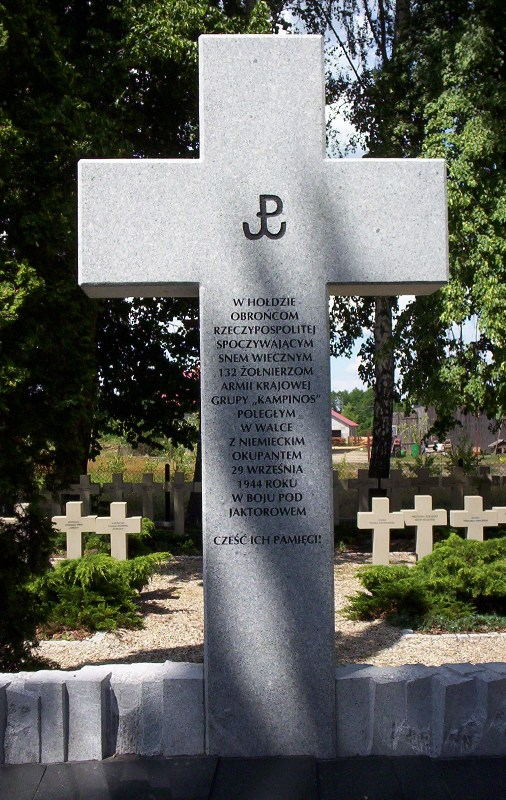
Monument at the war cemetery in Budy Zosine

The German command was convinced that only part of the Polish group had been surrounded at Jaktorów. This belief was effectively reinforced by 2nd Lieutenant Biały, who was captured at Baranów. He testified immediately after his capture that the Kampinos Group consisted of about 16,000 well-armed soldiers, half of whom had marched with Okoń towards Żyrardów, while the remaining part (the Korwin Brigade) had moved to the western part of the Kampinos Forest. That evening, Biały repeated this disinformation during an interrogation conducted personally by SS-Obergruppenführer Erich von dem Bach-Zelewski. Under these circumstances, the German command decided to continue Operation Falling Star. On September 29, both German combat groups combed the forest, reaching the line of Stare Grochale–Wędziszew (2 km southwest of Sowie Wola)–Nowe Budy–the southern edge of Górki–Nurty–the western edge of Kampinos. However, the German strike hit a void, as only in the Wędziszew area did the Sternschnuppe units manage to make weak contact with the enemy. The course of actions on September 30 was similar. General Bernhardt's units then reached the line of Kazuń Niemiecki–Secyminek–Polesie–500 m northwest of Cisowe (northern group) and Cisowe–Zamość–Bieliny–Bromierzyk–Famułki Brochowskie–Janówek–Brochów (southern group). The Bzura river bank from Wyszogród to Brochów was also blocked. However, German reports indicated that once again they failed to make contact with the Polish units. They only reported capturing four partisans and four “assistants” and seizing two submachine guns and 110 head of cattle. On October 1, the Germans, encountering “sporadic and weak enemy resistance”, reached the line of the Bzura river from its mouth to Witkowice, the edge of the forest 1 km northeast of Hilarów, and Sianno. In this situation, at 6:30 PM on October 1, the 9th Army command issued an order to end Operation Sternschnuppe.

In the summary of the operation, prepared on October 2 by the 9th Army counterintelligence, it was reported that during the forest sweep and pursuit of the Home Army units, 76 partisans were killed, and another 44 were taken prisoner (this number does not include the losses suffered by the Polish group at Jaktorów). German units also detained 804 able-bodied men, which corresponded to 75% of the partisans remaining in the forest after Okoń's forces had left. The report also mentioned finding numerous abandoned uniforms and white-red armbands in forest villages. German units completely destroyed 8 Polish villages, and in another 18, they burned a significant number of farms. Young men suspected of fighting in the partisan ranks were shot on sight.

The German command was not satisfied with the results of Operation Falling Star, as several hundred Home Army soldiers, including several cohesive units, managed to break out of the encirclement. The largest group of survivors was gathered by Lieutenant Dolina, who, with nearly 200 soldiers, moved from the Mariańska Forest to the Opoczno forests, where he made contact with local Home Army structures. In October, the group, reduced to about 80 soldiers, joined the 25th Infantry Regiment of the Home Army Piotrków-Opoczno Land. On November 9, after heavy fighting at Wincentów, the regiment was disbanded. Dolina then furloughed part of his soldiers, leaving about 60 cavalrymen armed only with machine guns in the ranks. With this organized independent Home Army cavalry unit, he continued to fight until January 1945. A group of about 20 soldiers under Corporal Stanisław Piszczek, codenamed Pogoń, also made their way to the Świętokrzyskie Mountains, joining the Home Army partisan unit led by Lieutenant Antoni Heda, codenamed Szary. After joining Pogoń's group and soldiers from the disbanded 25th Infantry Regiment, Szary's unit included a total of 66 partisans from the Kampinos Forest, including 43 from the Stowbtsy-Naliboki Group. Additionally, about 50 soldiers from Lieutenant Lawa's company, who had separated from the main forces of the Kampinos Group shortly before the battle at Jaktorów, made their way to the Brudzewice Forests behind the Pilica river. On October 4, Lawa's soldiers fought a fierce battle with a German manhunt. The Polish unit managed to escape the encirclement, but due to the high concentration of enemy units, Lawa decided that reaching the Świętokrzyskie Mountains was an unattainable goal and decided to demobilize his company (October 8).

At least several hundred Home Army soldiers attempted to return to the Kampinos Forest. This was facilitated by the fact that the Germans did not expect the partisans to attempt a retreat in that direction, so they entrusted the task of creating a cordon in the Baranów area to their Hungarian allies. The Hungarians, sympathetic to the Poles, allowed the escapees to cross their lines freely. In this way, between 100 and 200 partisans returned to the forest. They found themselves in a particularly difficult situation because almost all the forest villages had been burned, their inhabitants had fled or been displaced, and the edges of the Kampinos Forest were occupied by German units. Small groups of partisans were thus forced to build makeshift bunkers and shelters in the densest forest or on marshes, where the soldiers suffered from hunger and cold for weeks. Throughout October and November, German manhunts combed the forest, shooting on sight anyone suspected of being a partisan. The local underground network, led by Lieutenant Bohdan Jaworski, codenamed Wyrwa, (formerly deputy commander of the Palmiry-Młociny Regiment) and Lieutenant Józef Karney, codenamed Drewno (formerly commander of the drop platoon), tried to assist the escapees by providing food, civilian clothes, and false documents, and, whenever possible, placing them in the hospital in Laski.

== Commemoration ==
After the battle, the bodies of the fallen soldiers of the Kampinos Group were buried at the war cemetery in Budy Zosine. However, in the 1950s, the communist authorities decided to liquidate the cemetery and move the remains to the Warsaw Insurgents Cemetery in the capital. These actions met with strong opposition from the veterans' community. Nearly 1,000 people signed a protest letter. Veterans and their families also attempted to intervene with various state and party authorities, even at the ministerial level. Eventually, the authorities agreed to the reinterment of the bodies and the reconstruction of the cemetery. Currently, at the war cemetery in Budy Zosine, located about 3 km from the Jaktorów railway station, lie the remains of 132 soldiers of the Kampinos Group who fell on 29 September 1944, including the remains of Major Alfons Kotowski, codenamed Okoń. Only in 75 cases was it possible to determine the names or pseudonyms of those buried.

In September 1964, on the 20th anniversary of the battle, a monument in honor of the fallen soldiers of the Kampinos Group was unveiled at the cemetery in Budy Zosine. The monument was built on the initiative of the National Council in Grodzisk Mazowiecki. It took the form of an obelisk topped with a figure of an eagle with wings raised for flight. The monument bore a plaque with the inscription:

Here rest eternally 132 Home Army soldiers of the Kampinos group who fell in battle against the Nazi occupiers in the battle of Jaktorów on 29.IX.1944

As part of the cemetery's modernization carried out by the Council for the Protection of Struggle and Martyrdom Sites in 2004, the monument was demolished. In its place, a granite cross was erected, engraved with the kotwica emblem and the inscription:

In tribute to the defenders of the Republic who rest eternally. 132 soldiers of the Home Army Kampinos Group who fell in battle with the German occupier on September 29, 1944, in the battle of Jaktorów. Honor their memory!

== Bibliography ==
- Bielecki, Robert; Kulesza, Juliusz (1996). Przeciw konfidentom i czołgom. Oddział 993/W Kontrwywiadu Komendy Głównej AK i batalion AK "Pięść" w konspiracji i Powstaniu Warszawskim 1944 roku (in Polish). Warsaw: Radwan-Wano. ISBN 83-906159-1-6.
- Borkiewicz, Adam (1969). Powstanie warszawskie. Zarys działań natury wojskowej (in Polish). Warsaw: Pax.
- Gozdawa-Gołębiowski, Jan (1992). Obszar Warszawski Armii Krajowej (in Polish). Lublin: Redakcja Wydawnictw Katolickiego Uniwersytetu Lubelskiego. ISBN 83-228-0136-X.
- Kirchmayer, Jerzy (1984). Powstanie Warszawskie (in Polish). Warsaw: Książka i Wiedza. ISBN 83-05-11-080-X.
- Koszada, Jerzy (2007). "Grupa Kampinos". Partyzanckie zgrupowanie Armii Krajowej walczące w Powstaniu Warszawskim (in Polish). Warsaw: ZP GRUPA Sp. z o.o. ISBN 978-83-925916-6-5.
- Krzyczkowski, Józef (1962). Konspiracja i powstanie w Kampinosie (in Polish). Warsaw: Ludowa Spółdzielnia Wydawnicza.
- Nowak, Szymon (2011). Puszcza Kampinoska – Jaktorów 1944 (in Polish). Warsaw: Bellona. ISBN 9788311121416.
- Pilch, Adolf (2013). Partyzanci trzech puszcz (in Polish). Kraków: Oficyna Wydawnicza Mireki. ISBN 978-83-89533-92-0.
- Podgóreczny, Marian (2010). Doliniacy. Niepodległa Rzeczpospolita Kampinoska (in Polish). Vol. II. Warsaw: BMT ERIDIA. ISBN 978-83-930539-3-3.
- Podlewski, Stanisław (1979). Rapsodia żoliborska (in Polish). Warsaw: Pax. ISBN 83-211-0009-0.
- Sawicki, Jacek Zygmunt (2002). "Obroża" w konspiracji i Powstaniu Warszawskim. Dzieje Armii Krajowej na przedpolu Warszawy (in Polish). Warsaw: Bellona. ISBN 83-11-09407-1.
- Sawicki, Tadeusz (2010). Rozkaz zdławić powstanie. Niemcy i ich sojusznicy w walce z powstaniem warszawskim (in Polish). Warsaw: Bellona. ISBN 978-83-11-11892-8.
