= Śladów massacre =

- Part of the Invasion of Poland (1939)
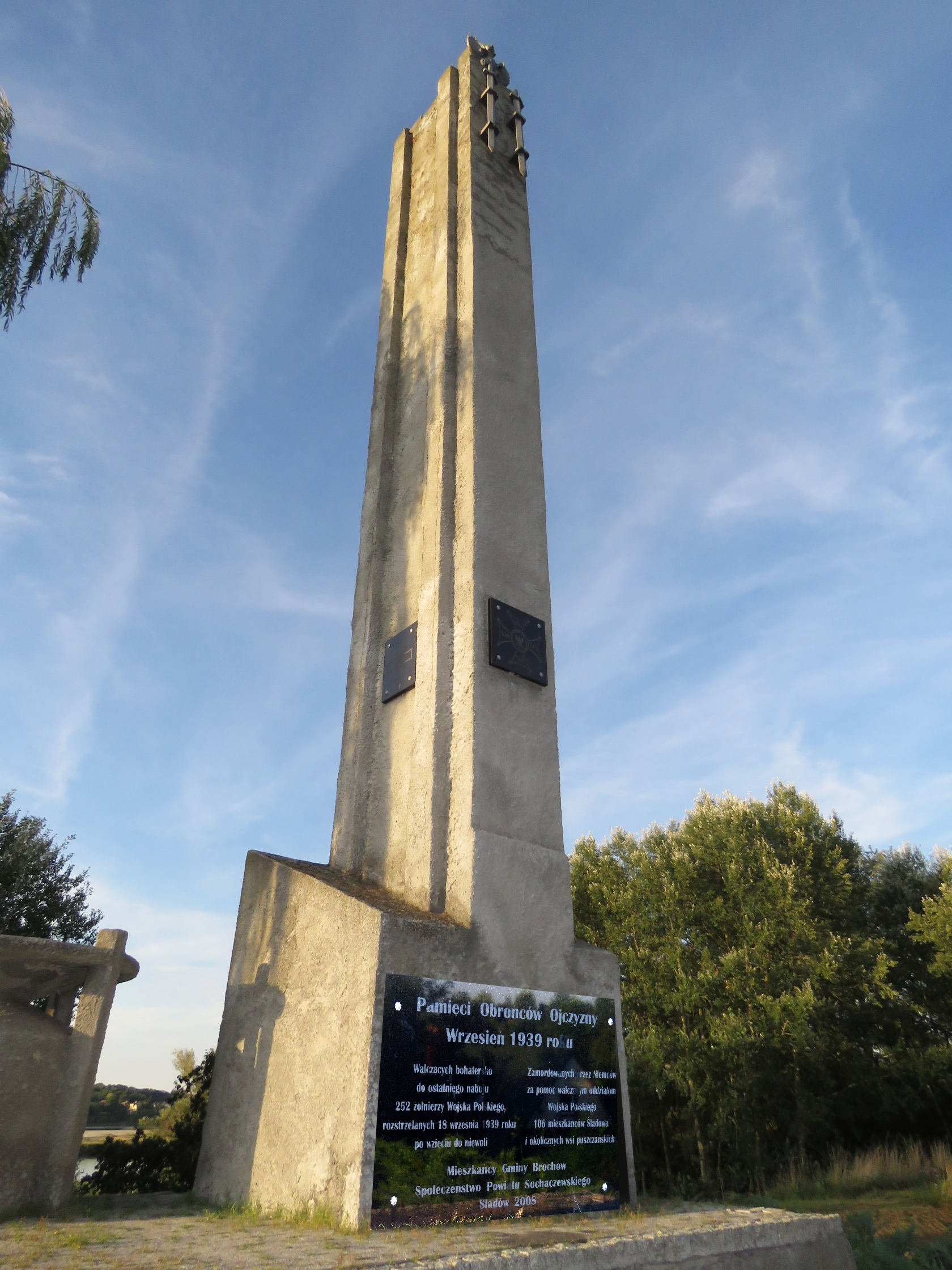
- Monument to the victims of the massacre

- Śladów massacre (Poland)
- Location: 52°23′02″N 20°17′46″E; Śladów, Poland
- Date: September 18, 1939
- Attack type: Mass murder
- Deaths: around 300
- Perpetrator: Wehrmacht

The Śladów massacre, occurring on September 18, 1939, near the village of Śladów, was a war crime committed by the Wehrmacht during its invasion of Poland. On that day, a large group of Polish prisoners of war and civilian hostages were either shot or drowned in the Vistula River. According to the majority of Polish sources, the number of victims reached 300; however, this figure may have been exaggerated.

== The massacre ==
The massacre took place on September 18, 1939, in the final phase of the Battle of the Bzura, on the bank of the Vistula, on the embankment called 'Słówka' (other sources refer to this place as the Vistula's 'heads').

According to an eyewitness, it occurred shortly after the Germans, using a 'living shield' composed of captured Polish civilians, broke the resistance of a dozen or so Polish cavalrymen who were defending themselves on the river embankment. Once the skirmish ended, civilians were ordered to bury the bodies of fallen soldiers and killed horses.

Meanwhile, a senior German officer arrived at the scene of the battle. After a short conference with him, Wehrmacht soldiers searched and robbed the civilians. Then the entire group, as well as a large group of prisoners of war who had earlier laid down their weapons, were rushed to the embankment and placed in two rows. In the meantime, the Germans were killing individual Polish soldiers who had been hiding in the coastal bushes and now revealed themselves with the intention of capitulating.

Shortly afterward, despite pleas for mercy, three machine guns opened fire on the crowd. Some of the victims were shot and later buried at the execution site. Some of them drowned after the Germans pushed them off the embankment into the river. Prisoners who tried to escape by swimming to the other bank of the Vistula were killed with rifle and machine gun fire.

Szymon Datner suggests that the massacre may have been motivated by pre-war conflicts between the local Polish population and ethnic German settlers, as well as a desire for revenge due to the fierce resistance of Polish soldiers in the Śladów area.

== Victims and perpetrators ==
According to Datner, over 300 Poles fell victim to the massacre. Among them were about 150 prisoners of war—both wounded and healthy—from the units of 'Poznań' and 'Pomeranian' armies defeated on the Bzura River, as well as approximately 150 civilians. The latter group included 84 residents of the then gmina of Tułowice, as well as war refugees from various regions of Poland. The murdered civilians were mainly men aged 15 to 75. Nevertheless, the victims of the massacre included at least several small children.

The number given by Datner is usually accepted by other Polish historians and investigators. However, as Tomasz Sudoł pointed out, Datner's calculations are based on the testimony of only one eyewitness. As a result, the actual number of victims may be lower than estimated. Ian Baxter estimated the number of victims as 252.

The register of places and facts of crimes committed by the Nazi Occupier on Polish Lands in the years 1939–1945 provides the names of 23 identified victims—residents of Śladów, Famułki Królewskie, Łasice, Przęsławice, and Wilcze Śladowskie. (Note: Stanisław Klejnowski, a survivor of the massacre, testified that even an ethnic German named Bucholz was among the victims. He was to be shot because soldiers believed that the shirt he was wearing had been taken from their fallen colleague's body (see: Datner (1961), p. 54). Nevertheless, this man's name does not appear on the Register's list of identified victims. (see: Register (1988), p. 281).)

Only two people survived the massacre: Stanisław Klejnowski and Alfred Kitliński (both were residents of the gmina of Tułowice). The latter lost his grandfather and 10-year-old brother during the execution.

The massacre was committed by an unidentified Wehrmacht armored unit. Datner assumes that the perpetrators could have been soldiers of the 4th Armored Division of the XVI Army Corps of the 10th Army, operating in this area and known for numerous war crimes. Jan Jarecki blames the soldiers of the 12th Rifle Regiment (Schützen-Regiment 12), which was part of this division and was commanded by Lieutenant Colonel Konrad von Czettritz und Neuhaus. The Register also states that, in addition to Wehrmacht soldiers, SS members also participated in the massacre.

== Aftermath ==
During the Nazi occupation, probably in 1942, an exhumation was carried out at the massacre site. The corpses of the murdered prisoners were buried at the war cemetery in Janówek Duranowski. The bodies of civilian victims were buried in parish cemeteries in Brochów, Kamion, and Leoncin.

Szymon Datner described the massacre in Śladów as 'one of the most monstrous crimes recorded in the chronicles of World War II.'

During the Nazi occupation, 37% of the inhabitants of the gmina of Tułowice died, and such severe terror against the inhabitants of these areas was at least partially inspired by local ethnic German settlers.

== Remembrance ==
In 1966, an obelisk-shaped monument was erected at the site of the massacre. Currently, there is a plaque with the following inscription:

In Memory of the Defenders of the Fatherland.
September 1939.
252 soldiers of the Polish Army fighting heroically until the last bullet, executed on September 18, 1939 after being taken prisoner.
106 inhabitants of Śladów and the surrounding forest villages murdered by the Germans for helping the fighting units of the Polish Army.
Residents of the Gmina Brochów, Society of Sochaczew County.
Śladów 2008.

== Bibliography ==
- Baxter, Ian (2021). Himmler's Death Squad – Einsatzgruppen in Action, 1939–1944: Rare Photographs from Wartime Archives. Barnsley: Pen and Sword Military. ISBN 9781526778567.
- Datner, Szymon (1961). Zbrodnie Wehrmachtu na jeńcach wojennych armii regularnych w II wojnie światowej [Wehrmacht crimes against prisoners of war in World War II] (in Polish). Warszawa: Wydawnictwo MON.
- Jarecki, Jan (1989). Walki kawalerii polskiej wrzesień 1939 [The battles of Polish cavalry, September 1939] (in Polish). Pszczyna: Towarzystwo Miłośników Ziemi Pszczyńskiej.
- Rejestr miejsc i faktów zbrodni popełnionych przez okupanta hitlerowskiego na ziemiach polskich w latach 1939–1945. Województwo stołeczne warszawskie [Register of places and facts of crimes committed by the Nazi Occupier on Polish Lands in the years 1939–1945. Warsaw Capital Voivodeship] (in Polish). Warszawa: GKBZHwP-IPN. 1988.
- Sudoł, Tomasz (2011). "Zbrodnie Wehrmachtu na jeńcach polskich we wrześniu 1939 roku" [Wehrmacht crimes against Polish prisoners of war in September 1939]. Biuletyn Instytutu Pamięci Narodowej (in Polish). 8–9 (129–130). ISSN 1641-9561.
- Wardzyńska, Maria (2009). Był rok 1939. Operacja niemieckiej policji bezpieczeństwa w Polsce. Intelligenzaktion [The year was 1939: An operation of the German security police in Poland. Intelligenzaktion] (in Polish). Warszawa: Instytut Pamięci Narodowej. ISBN 978-83-7629-063-8.
