= Śladów, Masovian Voivodeship =

Śladów
- Village
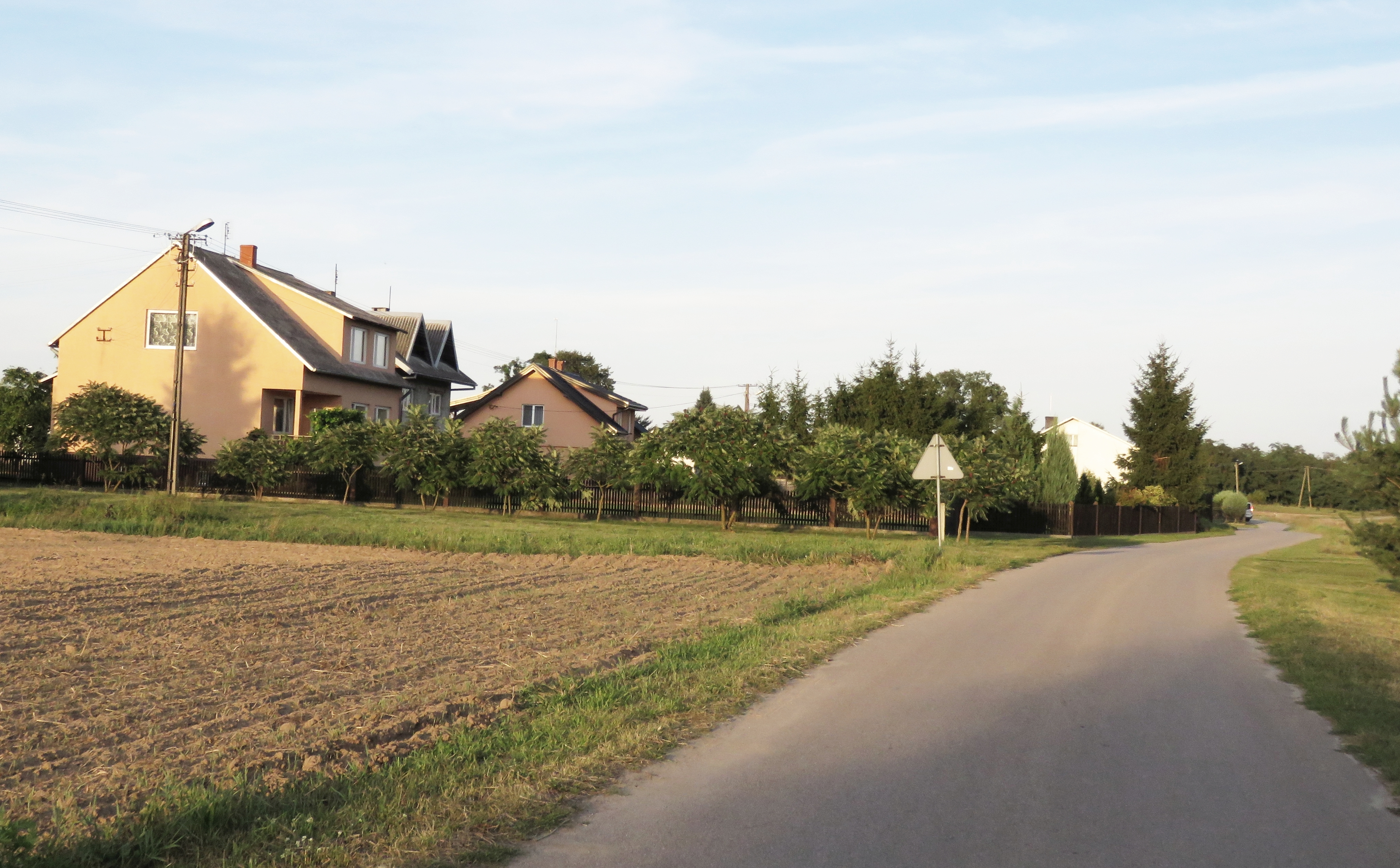

- Location within Poland
- Coordinates: 52°22′41″N 20°18′12″E
- Country: Poland
- Voivodeship: Lesser Poland
- County: Sochaczew
- Gmina: Brochów

Population
  - Total: 389 (2,021)
- Time zone: UTC+1 (CET)
  - Summer (DST): UTC+2 (CEST)
- Vehicle registration: WSC

Śladów [ˈɕladuf] is a village in the administrative district of Gmina Brochów, within Sochaczew County, Masovian Voivodeship, in east-central Poland.

== History ==
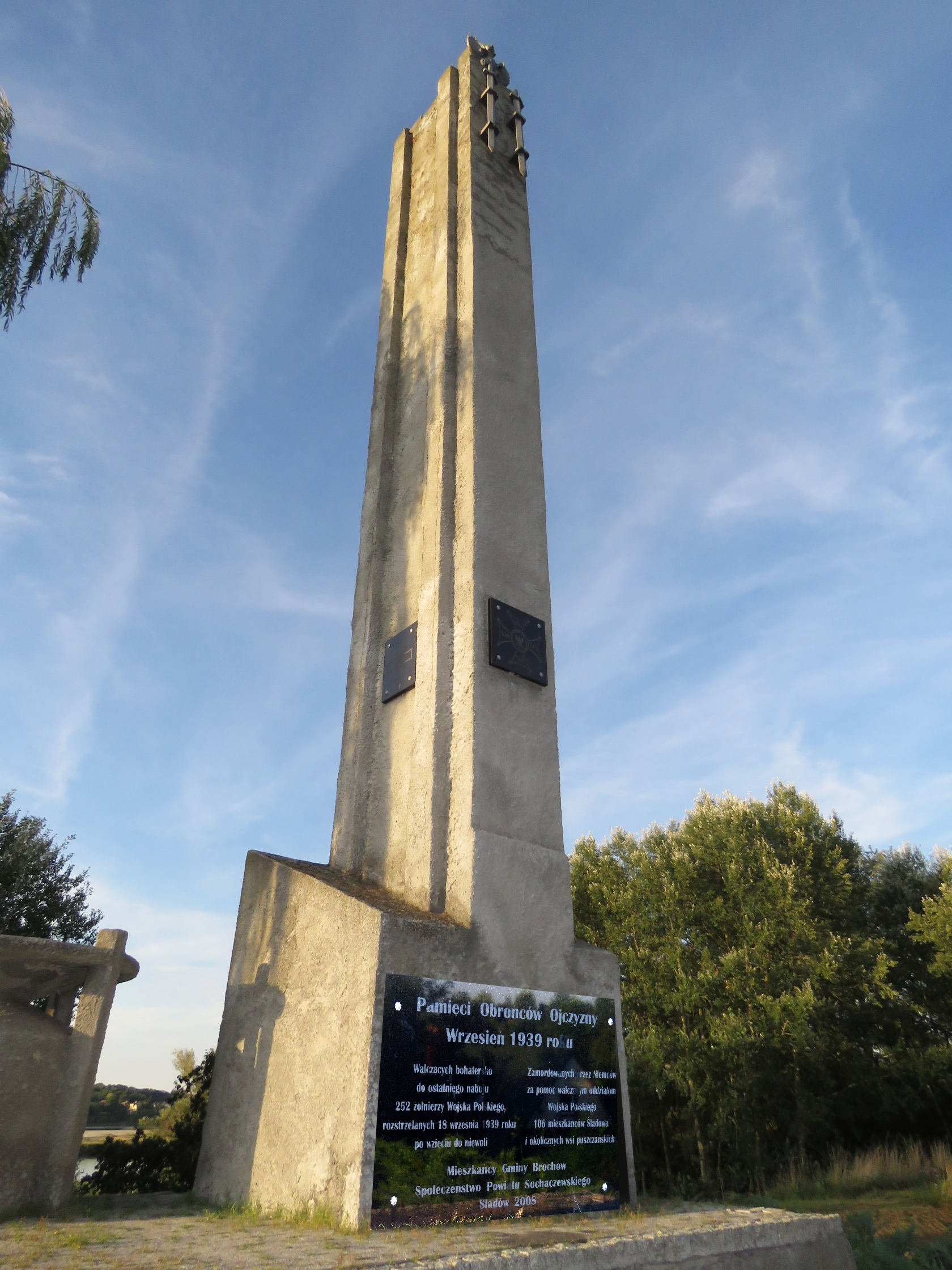
Monument for the victims of the Śladów massacre

In September 1939, during the German invasion of Poland, which started World War II, the village was a site of massacre of 300 people, including about a 150 Polish prisoners of war, by the German troops (the Śladów massacre) (another source gives the number of 252 PoWs).

== See also ==
- Nowa Wieś-Śladów
