= Olszowiec =

Olszowiec may refer to:

- Olszowiec, Lublin County in Lublin Voivodeship (east Poland)
- Olszowiec, Puławy County in Lublin Voivodeship (east Poland)
- Olszowiec, Opoczno County in Łódź Voivodeship (central Poland)
- Olszowiec, Radomsko County in Łódź Voivodeship (central Poland)
- Olszowiec, Gmina Lubochnia, Tomaszów County in Łódź Voivodeship (central Poland)
- Olszowiec, Subcarpathian Voivodeship (south-east Poland)
- Olszowiec, Gmina Brochów in Masovian Voivodeship (east-central Poland)
- Olszowiec, Gmina Iłów in Masovian Voivodeship (east-central Poland)
