= Bieliny =

Bieliny may refer to the following places:

- Bieliny, Grójec County in Masovian Voivodeship (east-central Poland)
- Bieliny, Subcarpathian Voivodeship (south-east Poland)
- Bieliny, Świętokrzyskie Voivodeship (south-central Poland)
- Bieliny, Pruszków County in Masovian Voivodeship (east-central Poland)
- Bieliny, Przysucha County in Masovian Voivodeship (east-central Poland)
- Bieliny, Radom County in Masovian Voivodeship (east-central Poland)
- Bieliny, Gmina Brochów in Masovian Voivodeship (east-central Poland)
- Bieliny, Gmina Młodzieszyn in Masovian Voivodeship (east-central Poland)
- Bieliny, Warsaw West County in Masovian Voivodeship (east-central Poland)
- Bieliny, Warmian-Masurian Voivodeship (north Poland)
