= Malanowo, Sochaczew County =

Malanowo
- Village
- Location within Poland
- Coordinates: 52°18′27″N 20°16′13″E
- Country: Poland
- Voivodeship: Masovian
- County: Sochaczew
- Gmina: Brochów

Malanowo [malaˈnɔvɔ] is a village in the administrative district of Gmina Brochów, within Sochaczew County, Masovian Voivodeship, in east-central Poland.
