= Brochów-Kolonia =

Village in Gmina Brochów, Poland

- Village
- Location within Poland
- Coordinates: 52°18′50″N 20°17′23″E
- Country: Poland
- Voivodeship: Masovian
- County: Sochaczew
- Gmina: Brochów

Brochów-Kolonia [ˈbrɔxuf kɔˈlɔɲa] is a village in the administrative district of Gmina Brochów, within Sochaczew County, Masovian Voivodeship, in east-central Poland.
