= Janówek, Sochaczew County =

Janówek
- Village
- Location within Poland
- Coordinates: 52°19′22″N 20°16′25″E
- Country: Poland
- Voivodeship: Masovian
- County: Sochaczew
- Gmina: Brochów

Janówek [jaˈnuvɛk] is a village in the administrative district of Gmina Brochów, within Sochaczew County, Masovian Voivodeship, in east-central Poland.
