= Gorzewnica =

- Village
- Location within Poland
- Coordinates: 52°22′N 20°23′E
- Country: Poland
- Voivodeship: Masovian
- County: Sochaczew
- Gmina: Brochów

Gorzewnica [ɡɔʐɛvˈnit͡sa] is a village in the administrative district of Gmina Brochów, within Sochaczew County, Masovian Voivodeship, in east-central Poland.
