= Gmina Brochów =

Gmina Brochów Brochów Commune
- Gmina
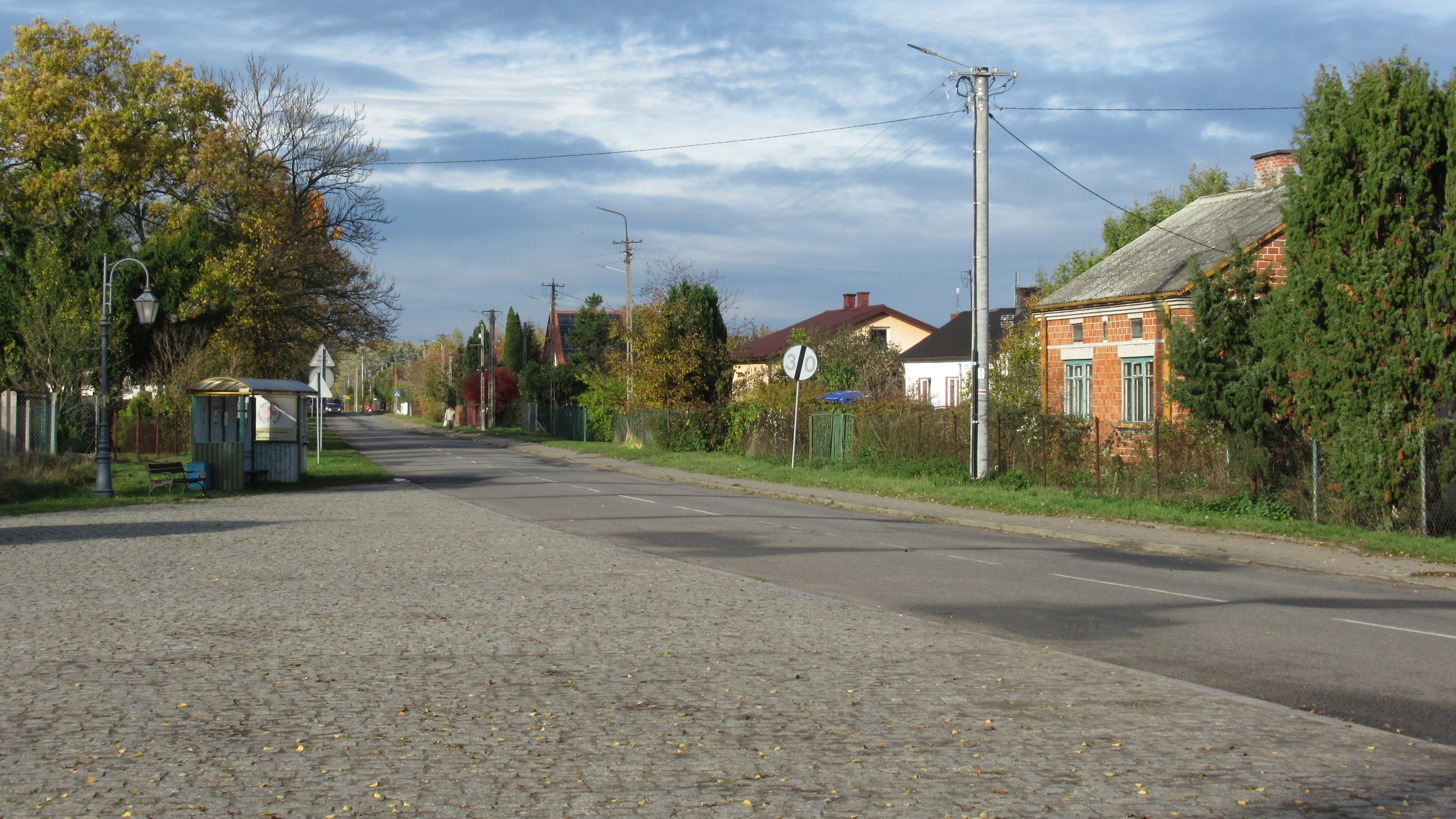

- Coat of arms
- Interactive map of Gmina Brochów
- Coordinates (Brochów): 52°19′22″N 20°15′58″E
- Country: Poland
- Voivodeship: Masovian
- County: Sochaczew
- Seat: Brochów

Area
  - Total: 116.76 km^{2} (45.08 sq mi)

Population (2006)
  - Total: 4,258
  - Density: 36.47/km^{2} (94.45/sq mi)
- Website: www.brochow.pl

Gmina Brochów is a rural gmina (administrative district) in Sochaczew County, Masovian Voivodeship, in east-central Poland. Its seat is the village of Brochów, which lies approximately 11 kilometres (7 mi) north of Sochaczew and 52 km (32 mi) west of Warsaw.

The gmina covers an area of 116.76 square kilometres (45.1 sq mi), and as of 2006 its total population is 4,258.

== Villages ==
Gmina Brochów contains the villages and settlements of:

- Andrzejów
- Bieliny
- Brochocin
- Brochów
- Brochów-Kolonia
- Famułki Brochowskie
- Famułki Królewskie
- Górki
- Gorzewnica
- Hilarów
- Janów
- Janówek
- Konary
- Kromnów
- Łasice
- Lasocin
- Malanowo
- Miszory
- Nowa Wieś-Śladów
- Olszowiec
- Piaski Duchowne
- Piaski Królewskie
- Plecewice
- Przęsławice
- Sianno
- Śladów
- Tułowice
- Wilcze Śladowskie
- Wilcze Tułowskie
- Wólka Smolana

== Neighbouring gminas ==
Gmina Brochów is bordered by the town of Sochaczew and by the gminas of Czerwińsk nad Wisłą, Kampinos, Leoncin, Młodzieszyn, Sochaczew and Wyszogród.
