= Andrzejów, Sochaczew County =

Andrzejów
- Village
- Location within Poland
- Coordinates: 52°18′36″N 20°19′7″E
- Country: Poland
- Voivodeship: Masovian
- County: Sochaczew
- Gmina: Brochów

Andrzejów [anˈdʐɛjuf] is a village in the administrative district of Gmina Brochów, within Sochaczew County, Masovian Voivodeship, in east-central Poland.
