= Brochocin, Sochaczew County =

Brochocin
- Village
- Location within Poland
- Coordinates: 52°18′14″N 20°18′19″E
- Country: Poland
- Voivodeship: Masovian
- County: Sochaczew
- Gmina: Brochów

Brochocin [brɔˈxɔt͡ɕin] is a village in the administrative district of Gmina Brochów, within Sochaczew County, Masovian Voivodeship, in east-central Poland.
