= Piaski Królewskie =

- Village
- Location within Poland
- Coordinates: 52°22′N 20°25′E
- Country: Poland
- Voivodeship: Masovian
- County: Sochaczew
- Gmina: Brochów

Piaski Królewskie (Polish pronunciation: [ˈpjaskʲi kruˈlɛfskʲɛ]) is a village in the administrative district of Gmina Brochów, within Sochaczew County, Masovian Voivodeship, in east-central Poland.
