= Janów, Gmina Brochów =

Janów
- Village
- Location within Poland
- Coordinates: 52°19′N 20°16′E
- Country: Poland
- Voivodeship: Masovian
- County: Sochaczew
- Gmina: Brochów
- Elevation: 70 m (230 ft)
- Population: 370

Janów [ˈjanuf] is a village in the administrative district of Gmina Brochów, within Sochaczew County, Masovian Voivodeship, in east-central Poland.

From 1975 to 1998, it existed as part of the Warsaw Voivodeship.
