= Lasocin, Sochaczew County =

Lasocin
- Village
- Location within Poland
- Coordinates: 52°18′N 20°21′E
- Country: Poland
- Voivodeship: Masovian
- County: Sochaczew
- Gmina: Brochów

Lasocin [laˈsɔt͡ɕin] is a village in the administrative district of Gmina Brochów, within Sochaczew County, Masovian Voivodeship, in east-central Poland.
