= Kromnów, Masovian Voivodeship =

Kromnów
- Village
- Location within Poland
- Coordinates: 52°22′40″N 20°20′11″E
- Country: Poland
- Voivodeship: Masovian
- County: Sochaczew
- Gmina: Brochów
- Population: 210

Kromnów [ˈkrɔmnuf] is a village in the administrative district of Gmina Brochów, within Sochaczew County, Masovian Voivodeship, in east-central Poland.
