= Plecewice =

- Village
- Location within Poland
- Coordinates: 52°17′N 20°18′E
- Country: Poland
- Voivodeship: Masovian
- County: Sochaczew
- Gmina: Brochów

Plecewice [plɛt͡sɛˈvit͡sɛ] is a village in the administrative district of Gmina Brochów, within Sochaczew County, Masovian Voivodeship, in east-central Poland.
