= Nowa Wieś-Śladów =

- Village
- Location within Poland
- Coordinates: 52°22′21″N 20°16′28″E
- Country: Poland
- Voivodeship: Masovian
- County: Sochaczew
- Gmina: Brochów

Nowa Wieś-Śladów [ˈnɔva ˈvjɛɕ ˈɕladuf] is a village in the administrative district of Gmina Brochów, within Sochaczew County, Masovian Voivodeship, in east-central Poland.
