= Kiścinne =

- Village
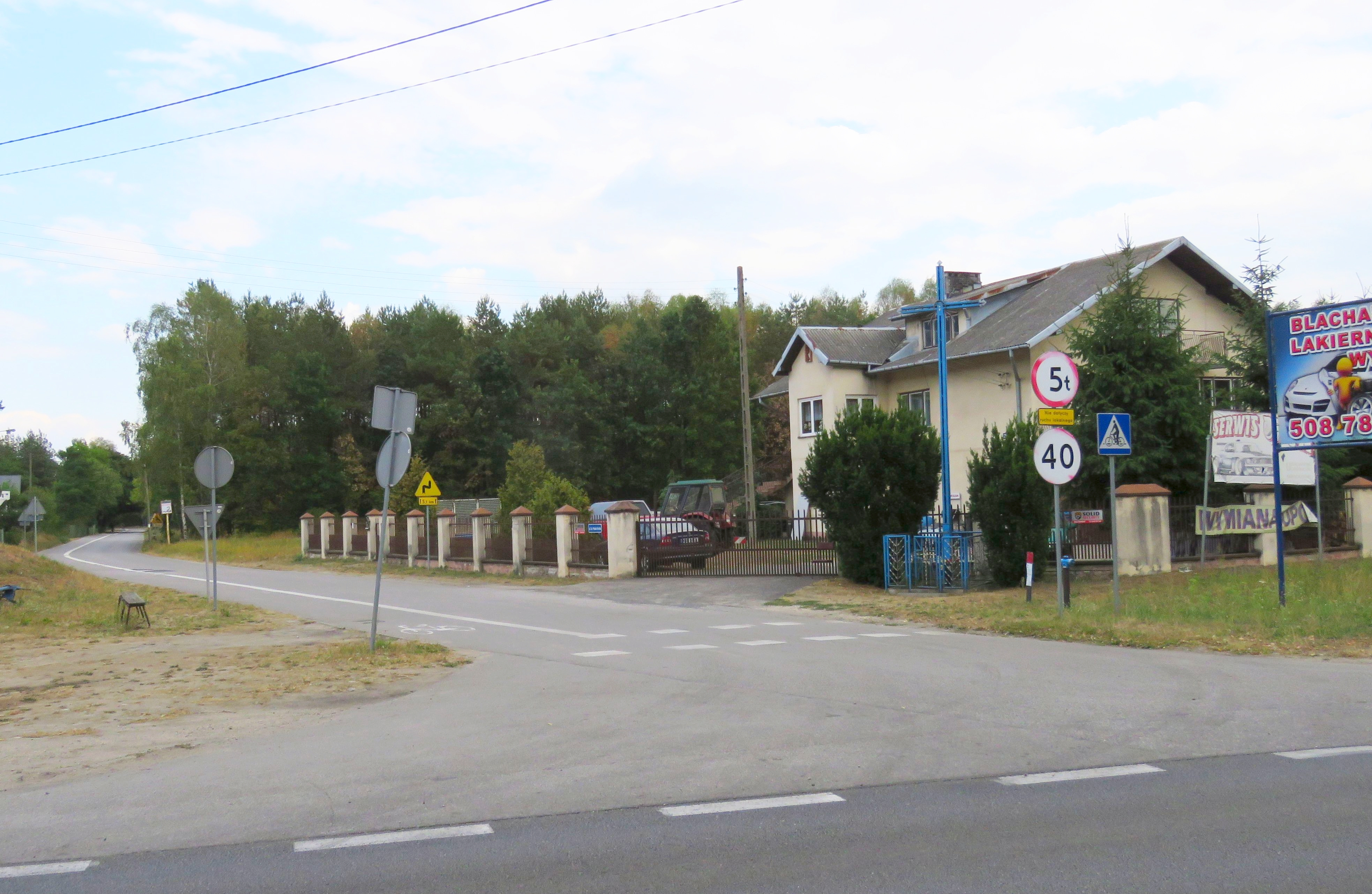

- Location within Poland
- Coordinates: 52°19′32″N 20°37′44″E
- Country: Poland
- Voivodeship: Masovian
- County: Nowy Dwór
- Gmina: Czosnów
- Population: 100

Kiścinne [kiɕˈt͡ɕinnɛ] is a village in the administrative district of Gmina Czosnów, within Nowy Dwór County, Masovian Voivodeship, in east-central Poland.
