= Nowe Budy, Gmina Leoncin =

Nowe Budy
- Village
- Location within Poland
- Coordinates: 52°19′N 20°33′E
- Country: Poland
- Voivodeship: Masovian
- County: Nowy Dwór
- Gmina: Leoncin

Nowe Budy [ˈnɔvɛ ˈbudɨ] is a village in the administrative district of Gmina Leoncin, within Nowy Dwór County, Masovian Voivodeship, in east-central Poland.
