= Grabina, Warsaw West County =

Grabina
- Village
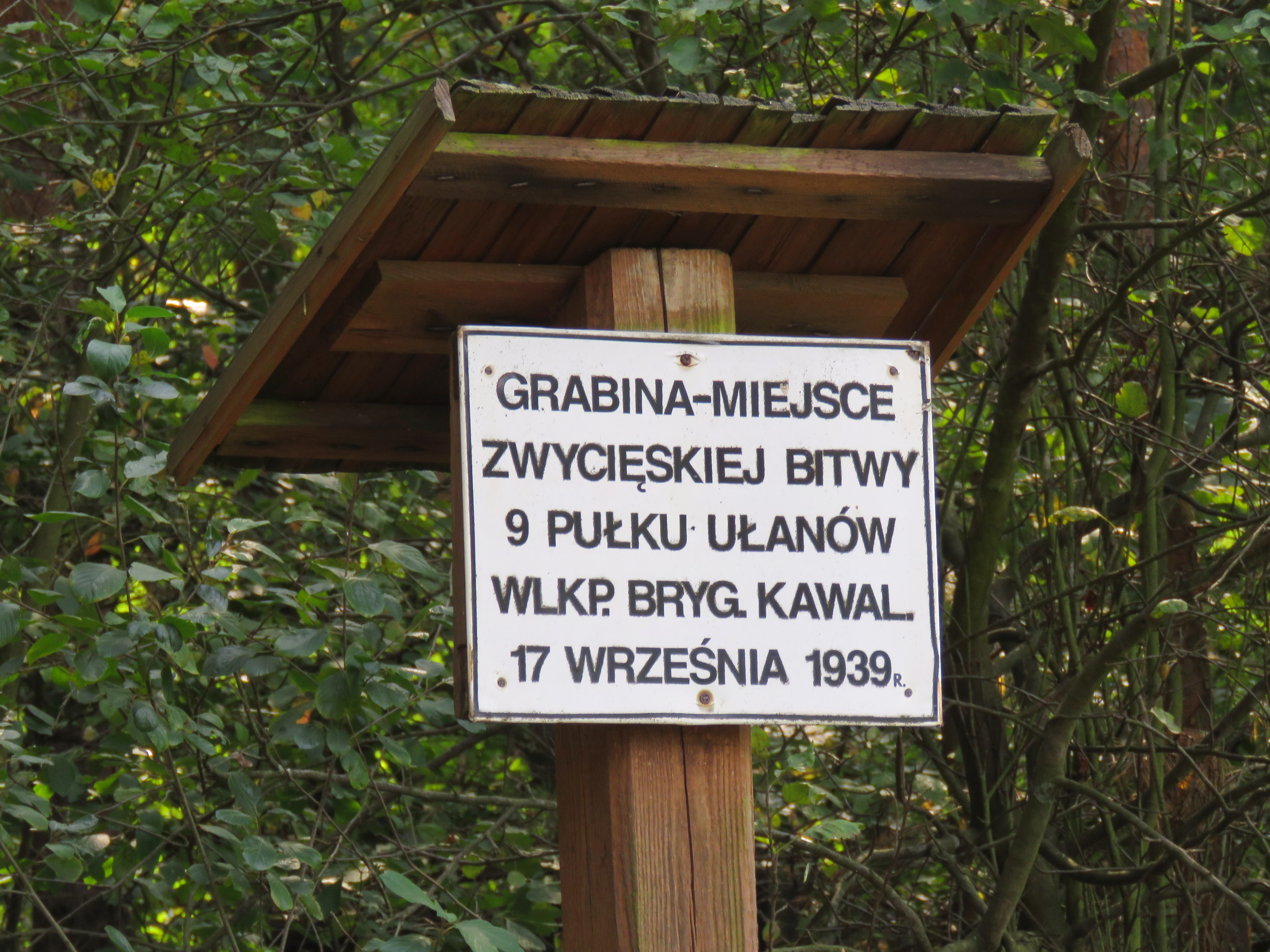
- Monument in Grabina commemorating a 17 September 1939 victory of a battle fought by the 9th Lesser Poland Uhlan Regiment during the German invasion of Poland

- Location within Poland
- Coordinates: 52°17′N 20°34′E
- Country: Poland
- Voivodeship: Masovian
- County: Warsaw West
- Gmina: Leszno

Grabina [ɡraˈbina] is a village in the administrative district of Gmina Leszno, within Warsaw West County, Masovian Voivodeship, in east-central Poland.
