= Ławy, Warsaw West County =

Ławy
- Village
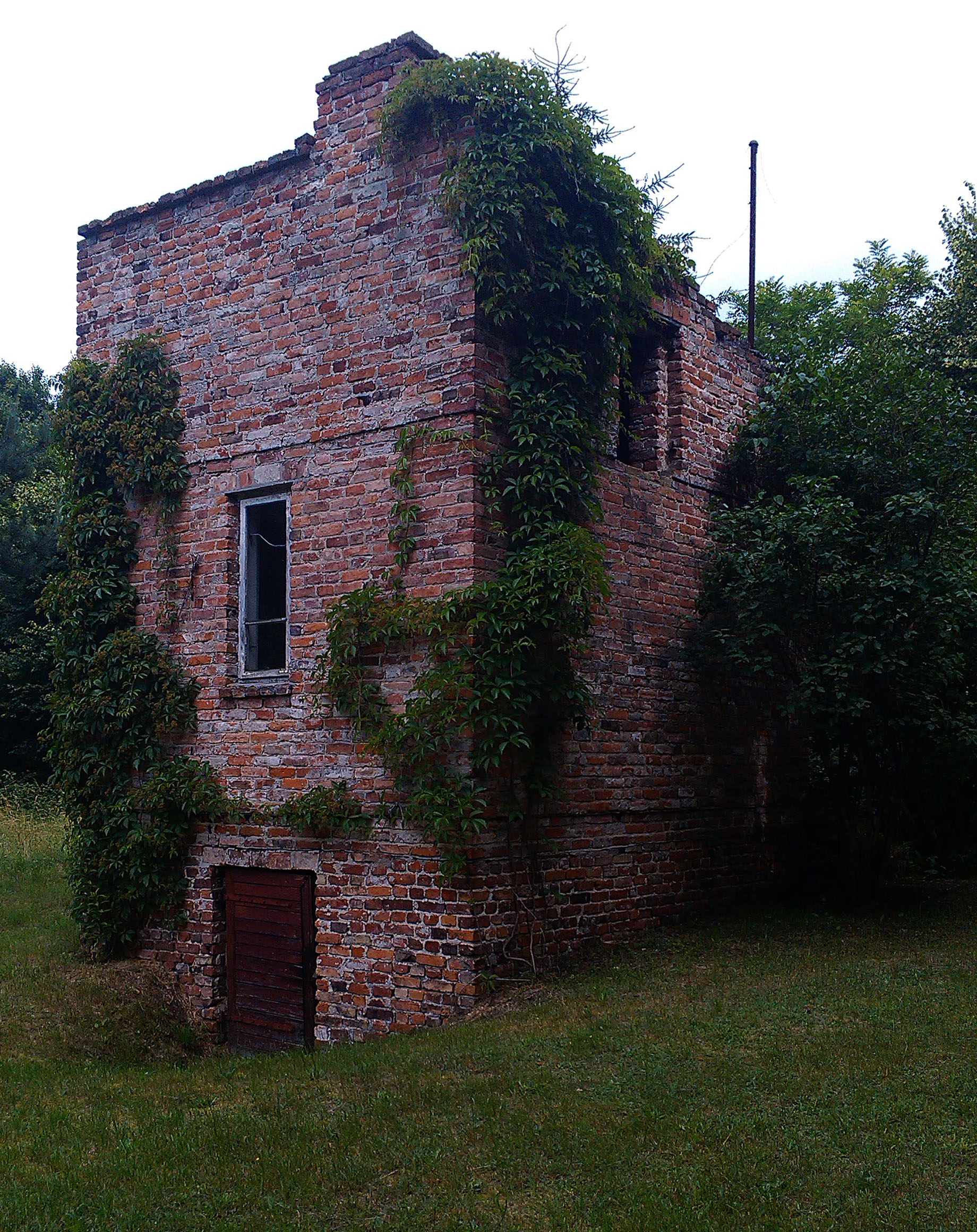
- Abandoned tower in Ławy

- Location within Poland
- Coordinates: 52°18′N 20°41′E
- Country: Poland
- Voivodeship: Masovian
- County: Warsaw West
- Gmina: Leszno

Ławy [ˈwavɨ] is a village in the administrative district of Gmina Leszno, within Warsaw West County, Masovian Voivodeship, in east-central Poland.
