= Olszowiec, Gmina Brochów =

Olszowiec
- Village
- Location within Poland
- Coordinates: 52°17′29″N 20°19′43″E
- Country: Poland
- Voivodeship: Masovian
- County: Sochaczew
- Gmina: Brochów
- Population: 50

Olszowiec [ɔlˈʂɔvjɛt͡s] is a village in the administrative district of Gmina Brochów, within Sochaczew County, Masovian Voivodeship, in east-central Poland.
