= Polska Ludowa =

PRL c.o.a (1955–1980)

Polska Ludowa (Polish: [ˈpɔlska luˈdɔva], transl. People's Poland) was a semi-official reference to the Polish state under Communism. The term was intended to imply the power of the working people in the state. It was a colloquial reference, including official speeches, but was also sometimes used in official documents.

The official names of the state were:

- Rzeczpospolita Polska (1944–1952) (transl. "Polish Commonwealth")
- Polska Rzeczpospolita Ludowa (1952–1989), Polish People's Republic
