= Przęsławice, Sochaczew County =

Przęsławice
- Village
- Location within Poland
- Coordinates: 52°22′N 20°15′E
- Country: Poland
- Voivodeship: Masovian
- County: Sochaczew
- Gmina: Brochów

Przęsławice [pʂɛ̃swaˈvit͡sɛ] is a village in the administrative district of Gmina Brochów, within Sochaczew County, Masovian Voivodeship, in east-central Poland.
