= Górki, Gmina Leoncin =

Górki
- Village
- Location within Poland
- Coordinates: 52°19′23″N 20°31′8″E
- Country: Poland
- Voivodeship: Masovian
- County: Nowy Dwór
- Gmina: Leoncin
- Population: 340

Górki [ˈɡurki] is a village in the administrative district of Gmina Leoncin, within Nowy Dwór County, Masovian Voivodeship, in east-central Poland.
