= Sianno =

- Village
- Location within Poland
- Coordinates: 52°19′6″N 20°18′37″E
- Country: Poland
- Voivodeship: Masovian
- County: Sochaczew
- Gmina: Brochów
- Population: 81

Sianno [ˈɕannɔ] is a village in the administrative district of Gmina Brochów, within Sochaczew County, Masovian Voivodeship, in east-central Poland.
