= Hilarów, Sochaczew County =

Hilarów
- Village
- Location within Poland
- Coordinates: 52°21′11″N 20°17′6″E
- Country: Poland
- Voivodeship: Masovian
- County: Sochaczew
- Gmina: Brochów

Hilarów [xiˈlaruf] is a village in the administrative district of Gmina Brochów, within Sochaczew County, Masovian Voivodeship, in east-central Poland.
