= Małocice =

- Village
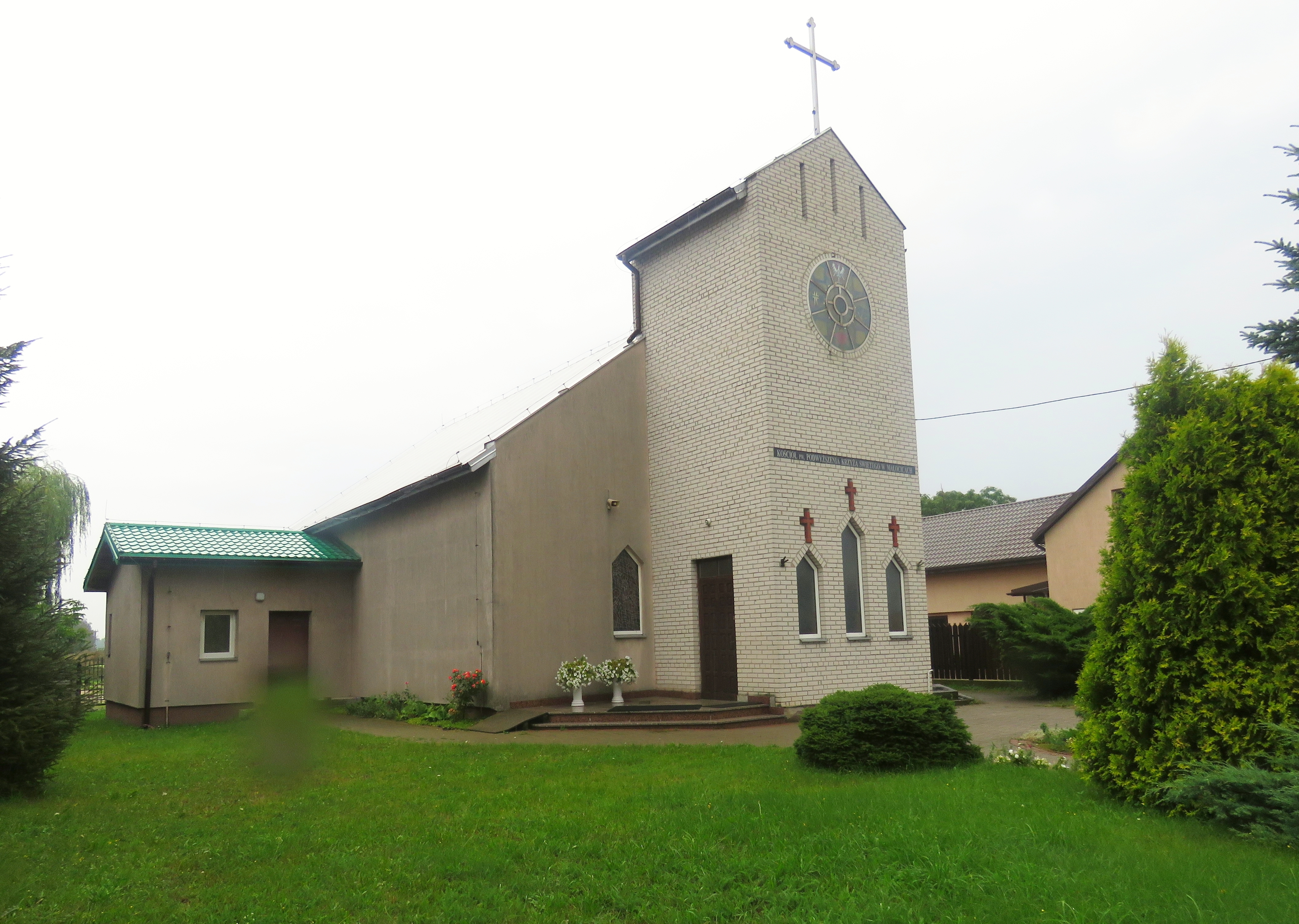

- Location within Poland
- Coordinates: 52°22′N 20°42′E
- Country: Poland
- Voivodeship: Masovian
- County: Nowy Dwór
- Gmina: Czosnów

Małocice [mawɔˈt͡ɕit͡sɛ] is a village in the administrative district of Gmina Czosnów, within Nowy Dwór County, Masovian Voivodeship, in east-central Poland.
