= Famułki Brochowskie =

- Village
- Location within Poland
- Coordinates: 52°18′40″N 20°21′16″E
- Country: Poland
- Voivodeship: Masovian
- County: Sochaczew
- Gmina: Brochów
- Population: 160

Famułki Brochowskie [faˈmuu̯ki brɔˈxɔfskʲɛ] is a village in the administrative district of Gmina Brochów, within Sochaczew County, Masovian Voivodeship, in east-central Poland.
