= Famułki Królewskie =

- Village
- Location within Poland
- Coordinates: 52°20′0″N 20°23′3″E
- Country: Poland
- Voivodeship: Masovian
- County: Sochaczew
- Gmina: Brochów
- Population: 140

Famułki Królewskie [faˈmuu̯ki kruˈlɛfskʲɛ] is a village in the administrative district of Gmina Brochów, within Sochaczew County, Masovian Voivodeship, in east-central Poland.
