= Tułowice, Masovian Voivodeship =

Tułowice
- Village
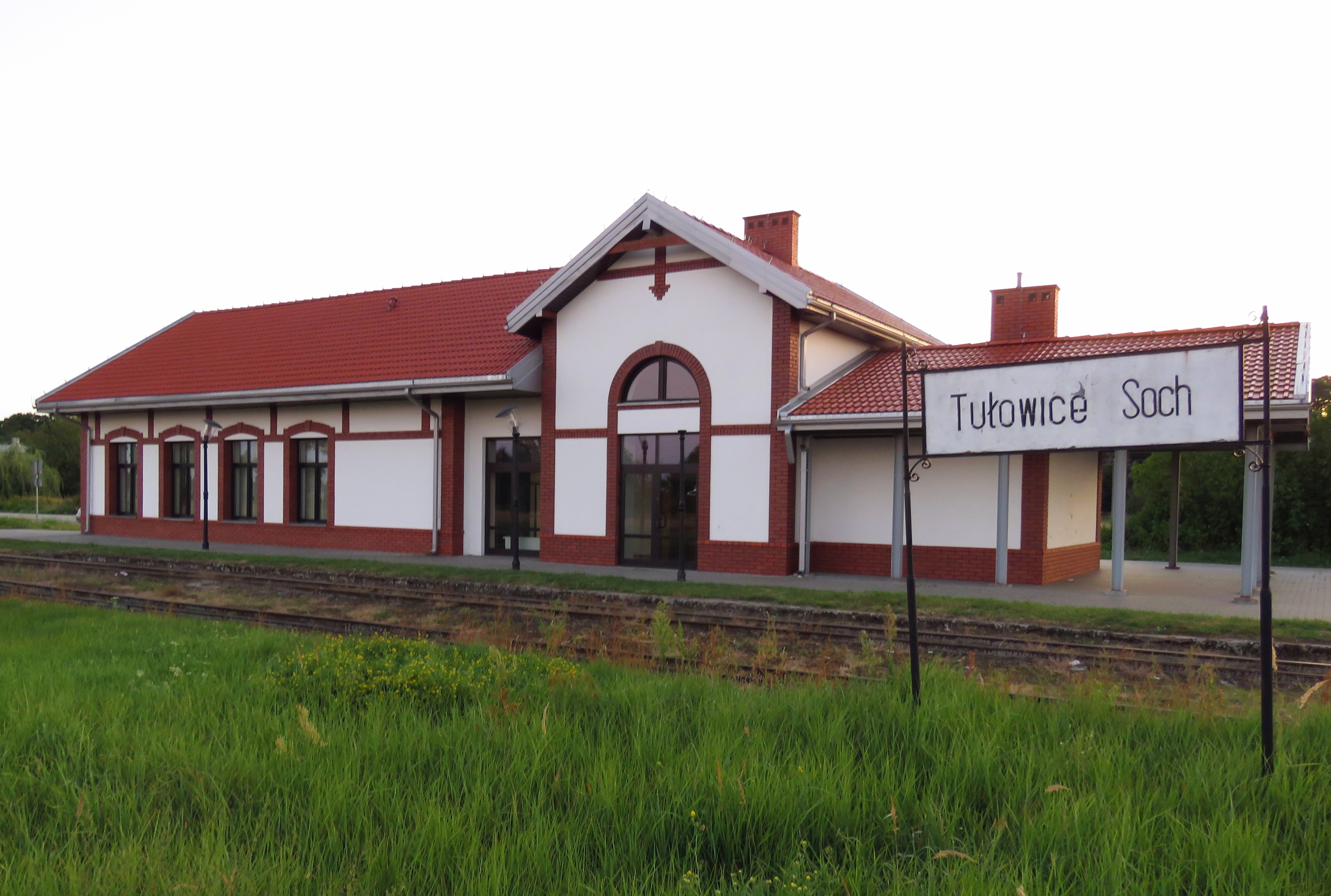
- Narrow gauge railway station in Tułowice

- Location within Poland
- Coordinates: 52°20′22″N 20°16′57″E
- Country: Poland
- Voivodeship: Masovian
- County: Sochaczew
- Gmina: Brochów
- First mentioned: 1361
- Population: 350
- Time zone: UTC+1 (CET)
  - Summer (DST): UTC+2 (CEST)
- Vehicle registration: WSC

Tułowice [tuwɔˈvit͡sɛ] is a village in the administrative district of Gmina Brochów, within Sochaczew County, Masovian Voivodeship, in east-central Poland.

There is a narrow gauge railway station and a historic manor house in the village.

== History ==
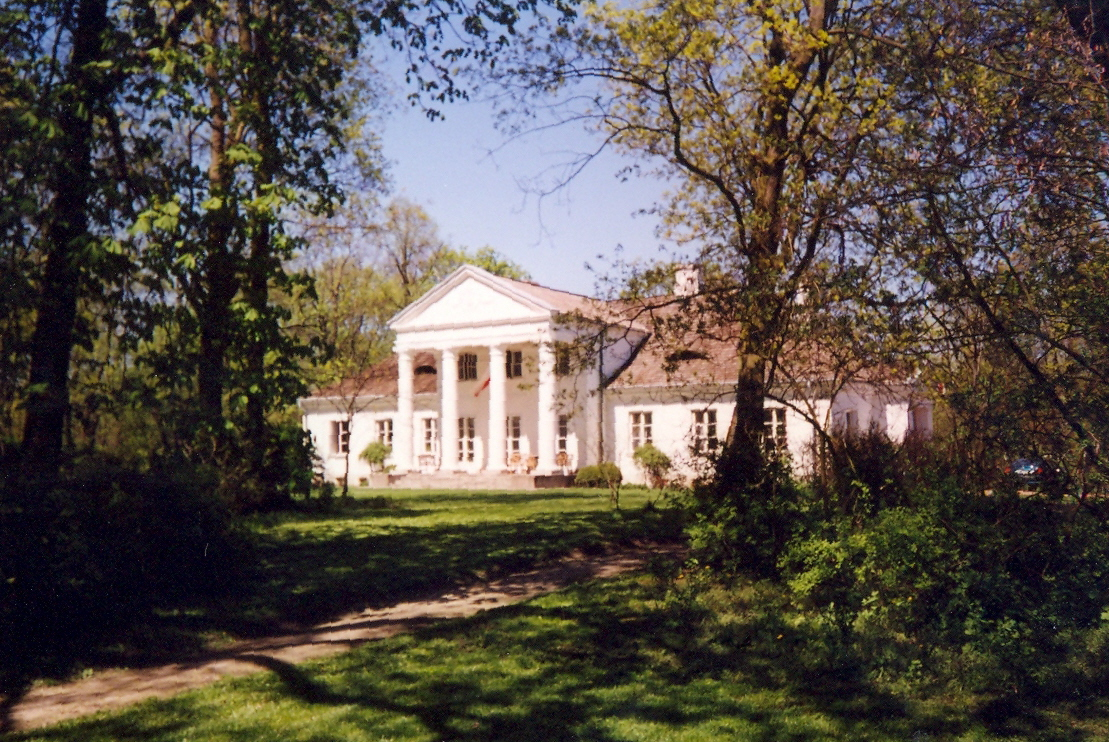
Old manor house in Tułowice in 2003

The oldest known mention of the village comes from 1361. Tułowice was a private village of Polish nobility, administratively located in the Sochaczew County in the Rawa Voivodeship in the Greater Poland Province of the Polish Crown. In 1827 it had a population of 136, and in the late 19th century it had a population of 219.

== Notable people ==
- Andrzej Novak-Zempliński (born 1949), Polish painter, owner of the local historic manor house
