= Zaborów, Warsaw West County =

Zaborów
- Village
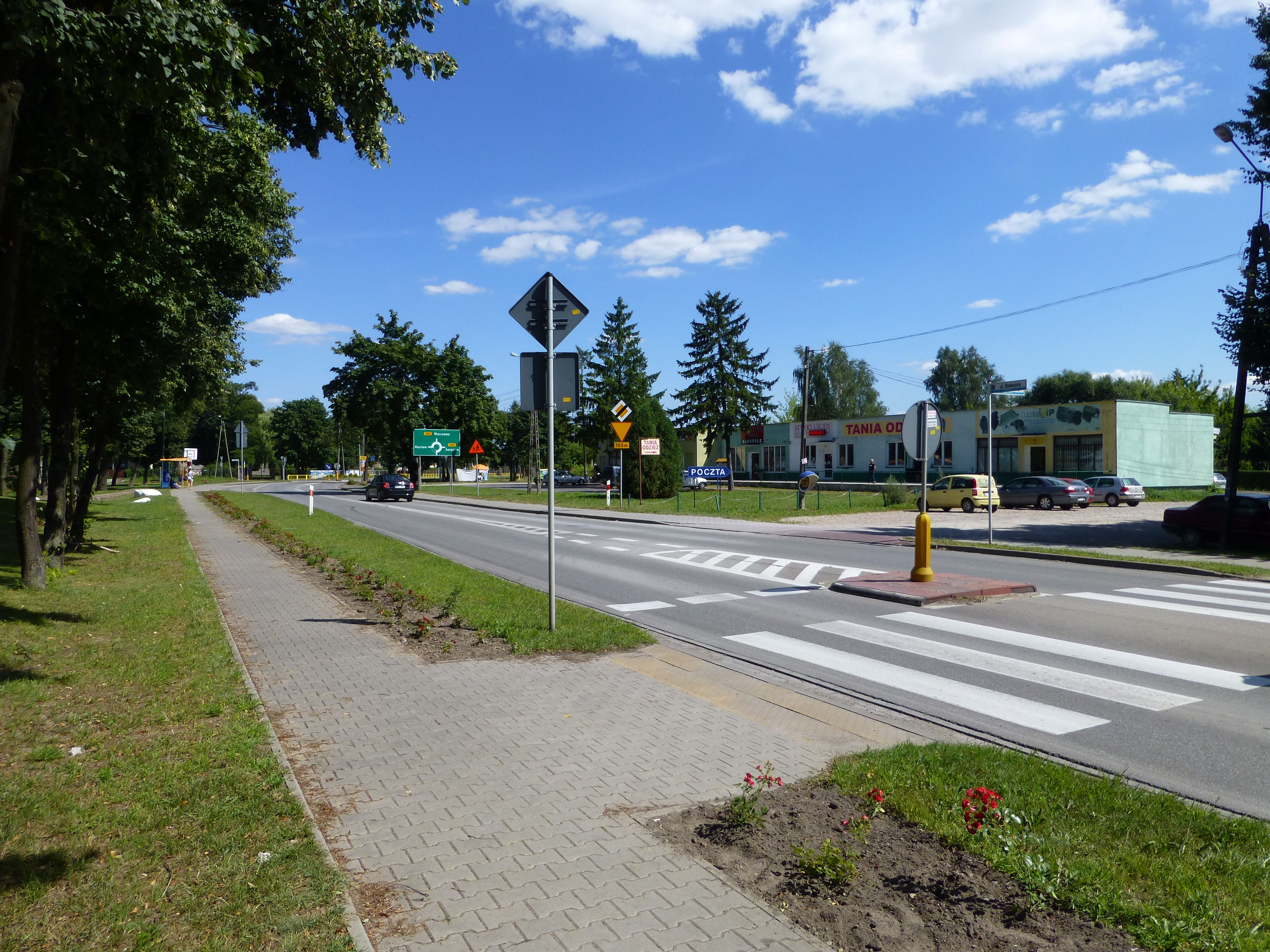
- Zaborów village center

- Location within Poland
- Coordinates: 52°15′44″N 20°40′37″E
- Country: Poland
- Voivodeship: Masovian
- County: Warsaw West
- Gmina: Leszno
- Elevation: 87 m (285 ft)
- Population: 680

Zaborów [zaˈbɔruf] is a village in the administrative district of Gmina Leszno, within Warsaw West County, Masovian Voivodeship, in east-central Poland.
