= Brochów, Masovian Voivodeship =

Brochów
- Village
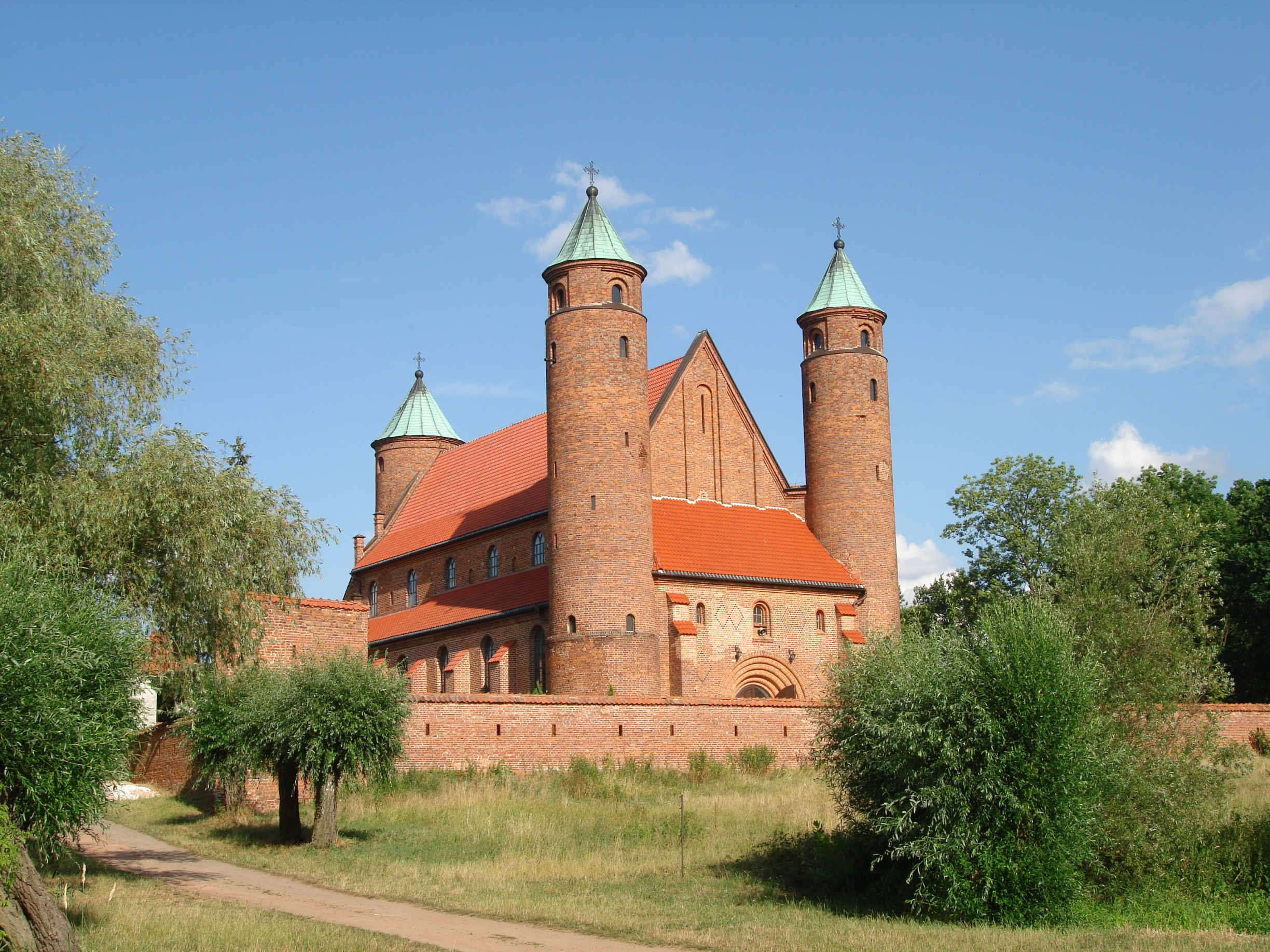
- Church of St. Roch and John the Baptist

- Location within Poland
- Coordinates: 52°19′22″N 20°15′58″E
- Country: Poland
- Voivodeship: Masovian
- County: Sochaczew
- Gmina: Brochów
- Elevation: 70.0 m (229.7 ft)

Population
  - Total: 400
- Time zone: UTC+1 (CET)
  - Summer (DST): UTC+2 (CEST)
- Vehicle registration: WSC

Brochów [ˈbrɔxuf] is a village in Sochaczew County, Masovian Voivodeship, central Poland. It is the seat of Gmina Brochów.

It was in the church at Brochów that Nicolas Chopin and Justyna Krzyżanowska, parents of the future composer Frédéric Chopin, were married on 2 June 1806. Frédéric was baptized there on 23 April 1810.

On 15 September 1939, during the invasion of Poland in World War II, Brochów was the site of a successful cavalry charge against German infantry by the 17th Greater Poland Uhlan Regiment.
