= Trzciniec =

Trzciniec may refer to the following places:

- Trzciniec, Bogatynia in Bogatynia
- Trzciniec, Gmina Białe Błota in Kuyavian-Pomeranian Voivodeship (north-central Poland)
- Trzciniec, Gmina Sicienko in Kuyavian-Pomeranian Voivodeship (north-central Poland)
- Trzciniec, Nakło County in Kuyavian-Pomeranian Voivodeship (north-central Poland)
- Trzciniec, Gmina Lubartów in Lublin Voivodeship (east Poland)
- Trzciniec, Gmina Michów in Lublin Voivodeship (east Poland)
- Trzciniec, Łódź Voivodeship (central Poland)
- Trzciniec, Gmina Chodel in Lublin Voivodeship (east Poland)
- Trzciniec, Gmina Łaziska in Lublin Voivodeship (east Poland)
- Trzciniec, Świętokrzyskie Voivodeship (south-central Poland)
- Trzciniec, Mława County in Masovian Voivodeship (east-central Poland)
- Trzciniec, Pułtusk County in Masovian Voivodeship (east-central Poland)
- Trzciniec, Siedlce County in Masovian Voivodeship (east-central Poland)
- Trzciniec, Warsaw West County in Masovian Voivodeship (east-central Poland)
- Trzciniec, Silesian Voivodeship (south Poland)
- Trzciniec, Drawsko County in West Pomeranian Voivodeship (north-west Poland)
- Trzciniec, Myślibórz County in West Pomeranian Voivodeship (north-west Poland)

It may also refer to the Bronze Age Trzciniec culture
