= Bogumiłowice =

Bogumiłowice refers to the following places in Poland:

- Bogumiłowice, Lesser Poland Voivodeship
- Bogumiłowice, Łódź Voivodeship
