= Markowizna =

Markowizna may refer to the following places:

- Markowizna, Łódź Voivodeship (central Poland)
- Markowizna, Silesian Voivodeship (south Poland)
- Markowizna, Subcarpathian Voivodeship (south-east Poland)
