= Grądki =

Grądki may refer to the following places:

- Grądki, Masovian Voivodeship (east-central Poland)
- Grądki, Subcarpathian Voivodeship (south-east Poland)
- Grądki, Warmian-Masurian Voivodeship (north Poland)
