= Złotniki, Pajęczno County =

Złotniki
- Village
- Location within Poland
- Coordinates: 51°12′42″N 19°13′56″E
- Country: Poland
- Voivodeship: Łódź
- County: Pajęczno
- Gmina: Sulmierzyce

Złotniki [zwɔtˈniki] is a village in the administrative district of Gmina Sulmierzyce, within Pajęczno County, Łódź Voivodeship, in central Poland.
