= Dąbrowa, Gmina Sulmierzyce =

Dąbrowa
- Village
- Location within Poland
- Coordinates: 51°10′39″N 19°11′50″E
- Country: Poland
- Voivodeship: Łódź
- County: Pajęczno
- Gmina: Sulmierzyce
- Population: 120

Dąbrowa [dɔmˈbrɔva] is a village in the administrative district of Gmina Sulmierzyce, within Pajęczno County, Łódź Voivodeship, in central Poland.
