= Stelmachowo, Masovian Voivodeship =

Stelmachowo
- Village
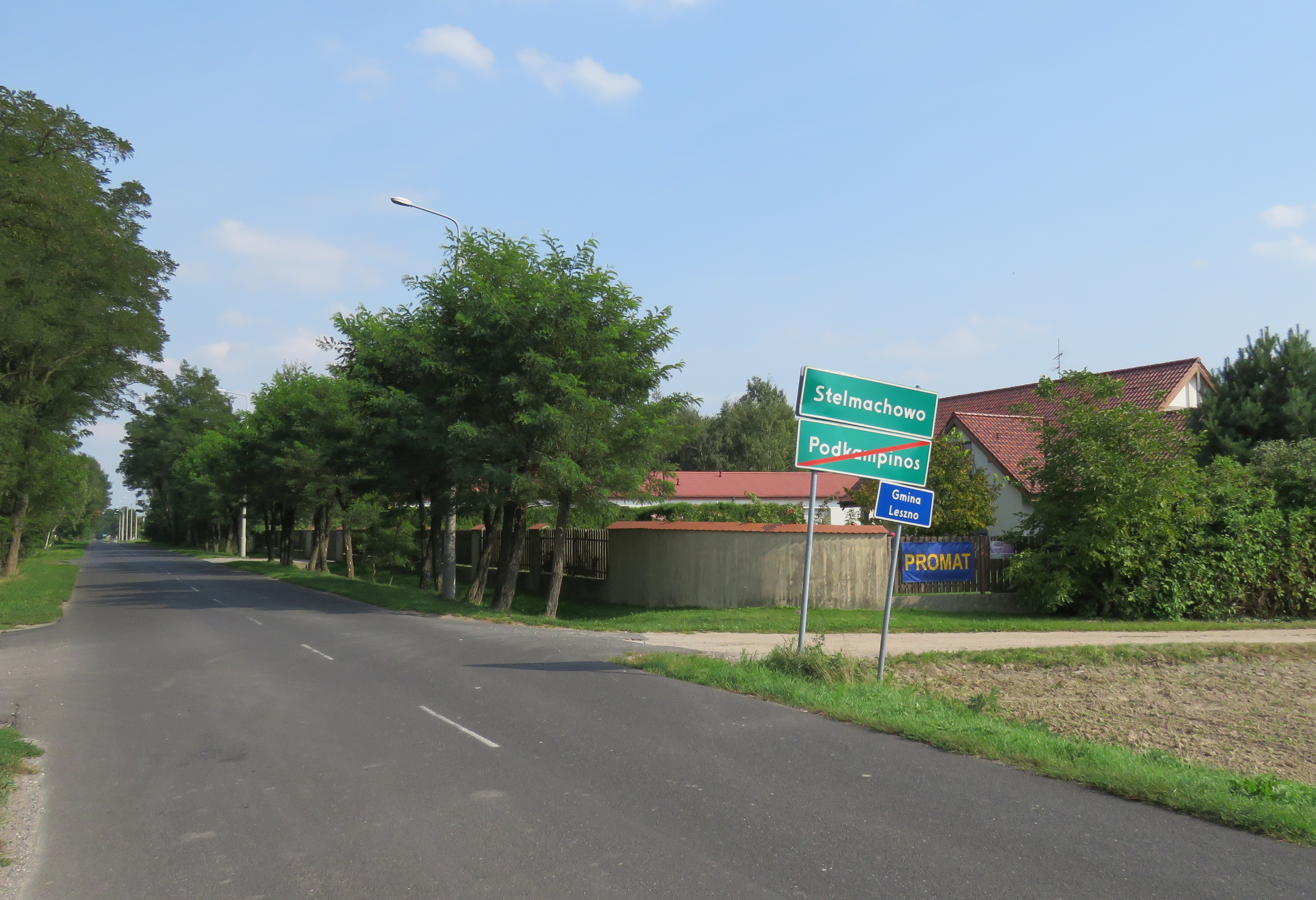
- Entering Stelmachowo

- Location within Poland
- Coordinates: 52°14′18″N 20°28′13″E
- Country: Poland
- Voivodeship: Masovian
- County: Warsaw West
- Gmina: Leszno

Stelmachowo [stɛlmaˈxɔvɔ] is a village in the administrative district of Gmina Leszno, within Warsaw West County, Masovian Voivodeship, in central-eastern Poland.
