= Wąsy-Kolonia =

- Village
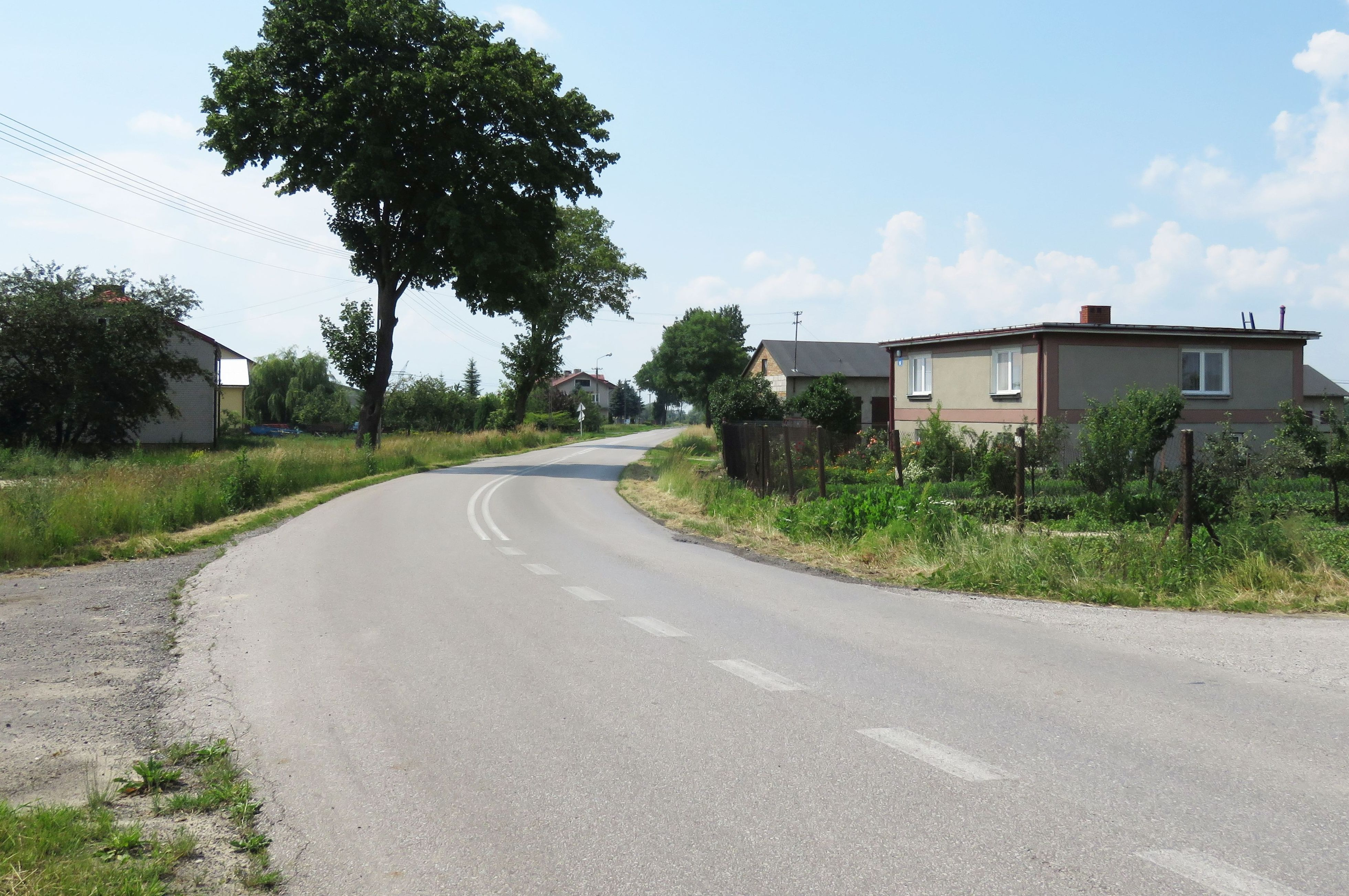
- Road through Wąsy-Kolonia

- Location within Poland
- Coordinates: 52°14′12″N 20°39′26″E
- Country: Poland
- Voivodeship: Masovian
- County: Warsaw West
- Gmina: Leszno

Wąsy-Kolonia [ˈvɔ̃sɨ kɔˈlɔɲa] is a village in the administrative district of Gmina Leszno, within Warsaw West County, Masovian Voivodeship, in east-central Poland.
