= Podrochale =

- Village
- Location within Poland
- Coordinates: 52°14′37″N 20°32′51″E
- Country: Poland
- Voivodeship: Masovian
- County: Warsaw West
- Gmina: Leszno

Podrochale [pɔdrɔˈxalɛ] is a village in the administrative district of Gmina Leszno, within Warsaw West County, Masovian Voivodeship, in east-central Poland.
