= Eligiów =

Village in Gmina Sulmierzyce, Poland

- Village
- Location within Poland
- Coordinates: 51°12′52″N 19°12′23″E
- Country: Poland
- Voivodeship: Łódź
- County: Pajęczno
- Gmina: Sulmierzyce

Eligiów [ɛˈliɡʲuf] is a village in the administrative district of Gmina Sulmierzyce, within Pajęczno County, Łódź Voivodeship, in central Poland.
