= Kuźnica, Gmina Sulmierzyce =

Kuźnica
- Village
- Location within Poland
- Coordinates: 51°13′13″N 19°10′35″E
- Country: Poland
- Voivodeship: Łódź
- County: Pajęczno
- Gmina: Sulmierzyce

Kuźnica (Polish pronunciation: [kuʑˈɲit͡sa]) is a village in the administrative district of Gmina Sulmierzyce, within Pajęczno County, Łódź Voivodeship, in central Poland.
