= Wólka, Warsaw West County =

Wólka
- Village
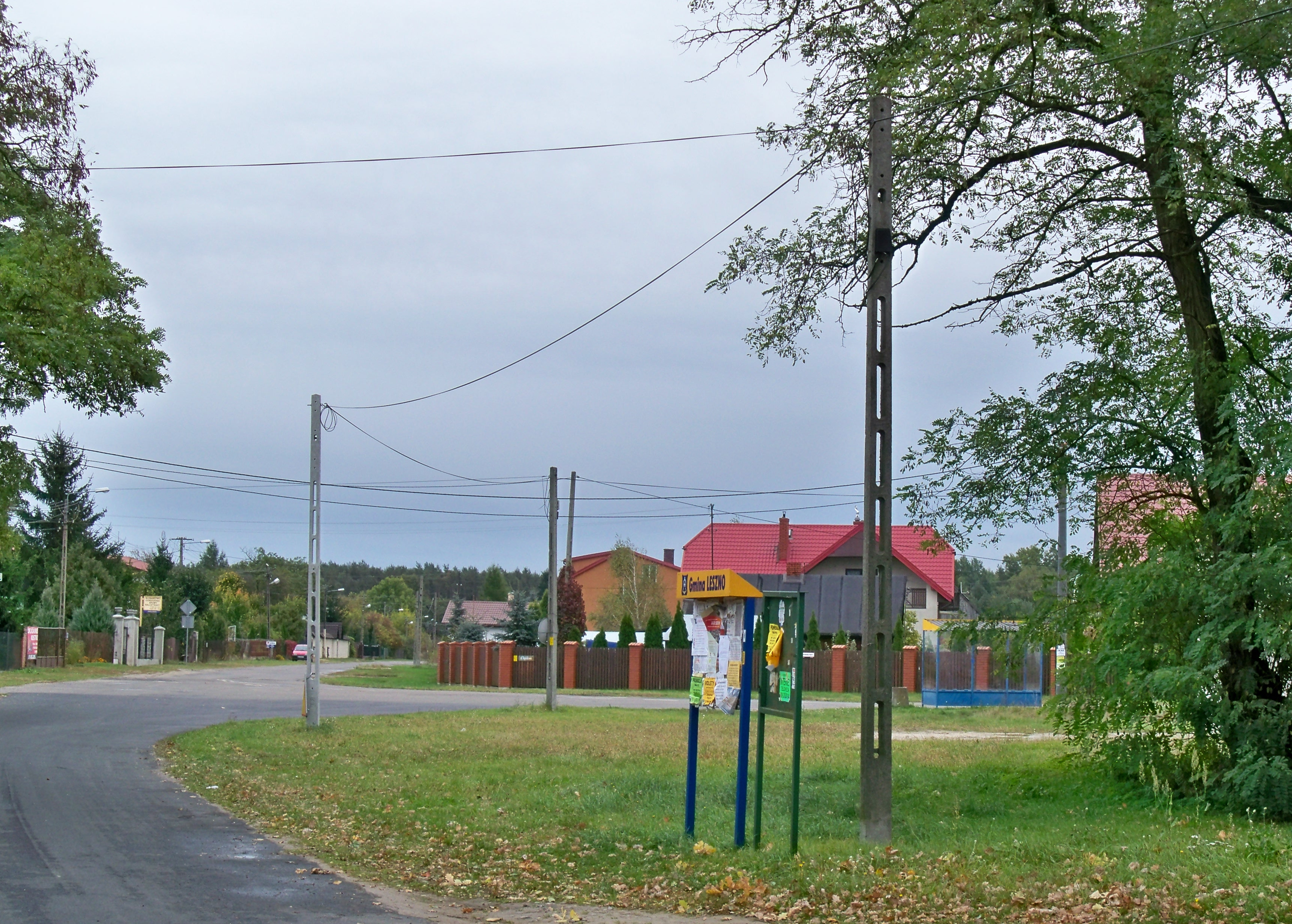
- Village as seen from the edge of Kampinos National Park

- Location within Poland
- Coordinates: 52°17′N 20°43′E
- Country: Poland
- Voivodeship: Masovian
- County: Warsaw West
- Gmina: Leszno

Wólka [ˈvulka] is a village in the administrative district of Gmina Leszno, within Warsaw West County, Masovian Voivodeship, in east-central Poland.
