= Plewniak =

- Village
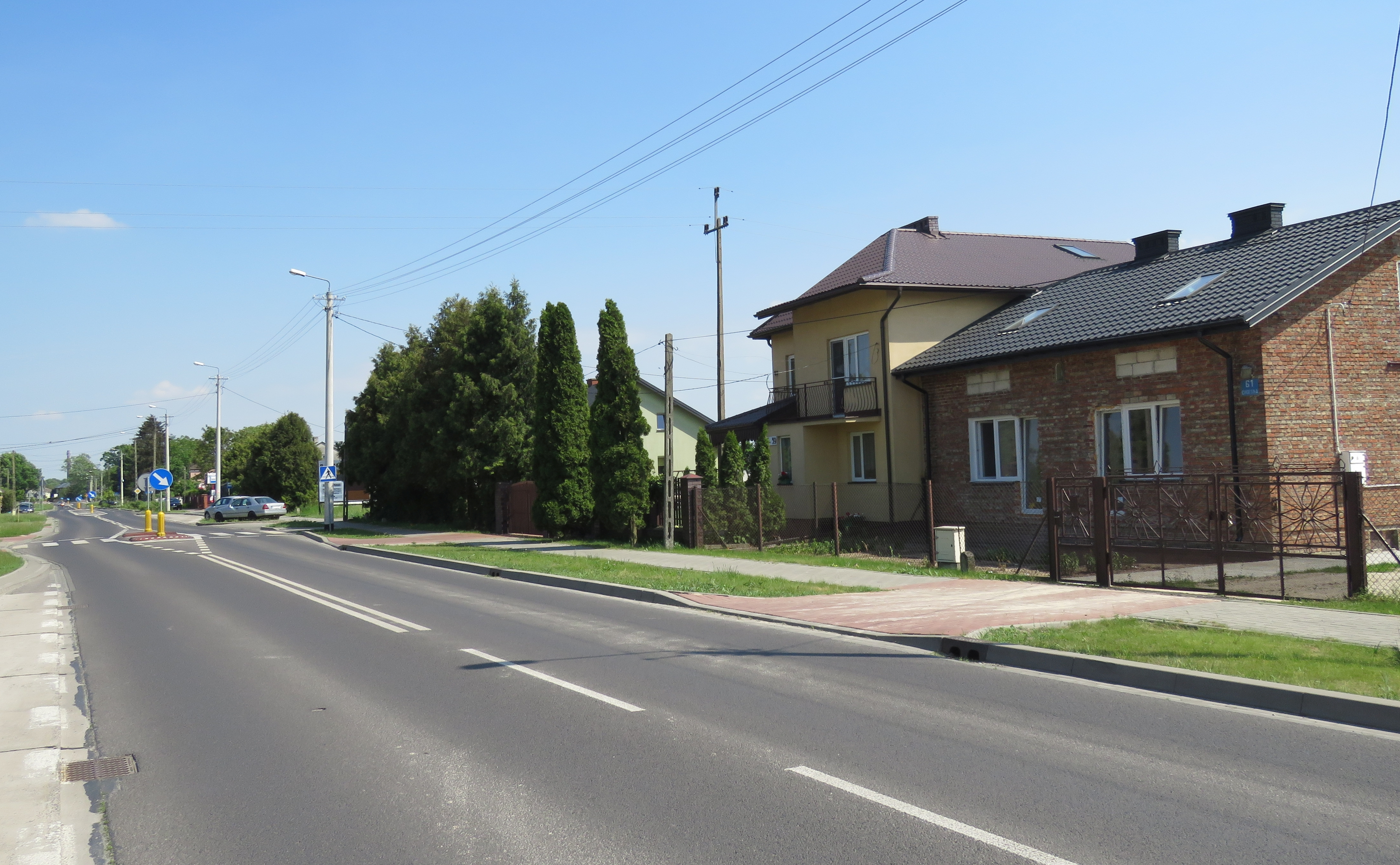
- Road through Plewniak

- Location within Poland
- Coordinates: 52°15′24″N 20°32′52″E
- Country: Poland
- Voivodeship: Masovian
- County: Warsaw West
- Gmina: Leszno

Plewniak [ˈplɛvɲak] is a village in the administrative district of Gmina Leszno, within Warsaw West County, Masovian Voivodeship, in east-central Poland.
