= Dworszowice Pakoszowe =

- Village
- Location within Poland
- Coordinates: 51°10′N 19°6′E
- Country: Poland
- Voivodeship: Łódź
- County: Pajęczno
- Gmina: Sulmierzyce
- Elevation: 226 m (741 ft)
- Population: 800

Dworszowice Pakoszowe [dvɔrʂɔˈvit͡sɛ pakɔˈʂɔvɛ] is a village in the administrative district of Gmina Sulmierzyce, within Pajęczno County, Łódź Voivodeship, in central Poland.
