= Ksawerów, Pajęczno County =

Ksawerów
- Village
- Location within Poland
- Coordinates: 51°13′30″N 19°11′19″E
- Country: Poland
- Voivodeship: Łódź
- County: Pajęczno
- Gmina: Sulmierzyce

Ksawerów [ksaˈvɛruf] is a village in the administrative district of Gmina Sulmierzyce, within Pajęczno County, Łódź Voivodeship, in central Poland.
