= Ostrołęka, Pajęczno County =

Ostrołęka
- Village
- Location within Poland
- Coordinates: 51°10′N 19°8′E
- Country: Poland
- Voivodeship: Łódź
- County: Pajęczno
- Gmina: Sulmierzyce

Ostrołęka [ɔstrɔˈwɛŋka] is a village in the administrative district of Gmina Sulmierzyce, within Pajęczno County, Łódź Voivodeship, in central Poland.
