= Wilków, Masovian Voivodeship =

Wilków
- Village
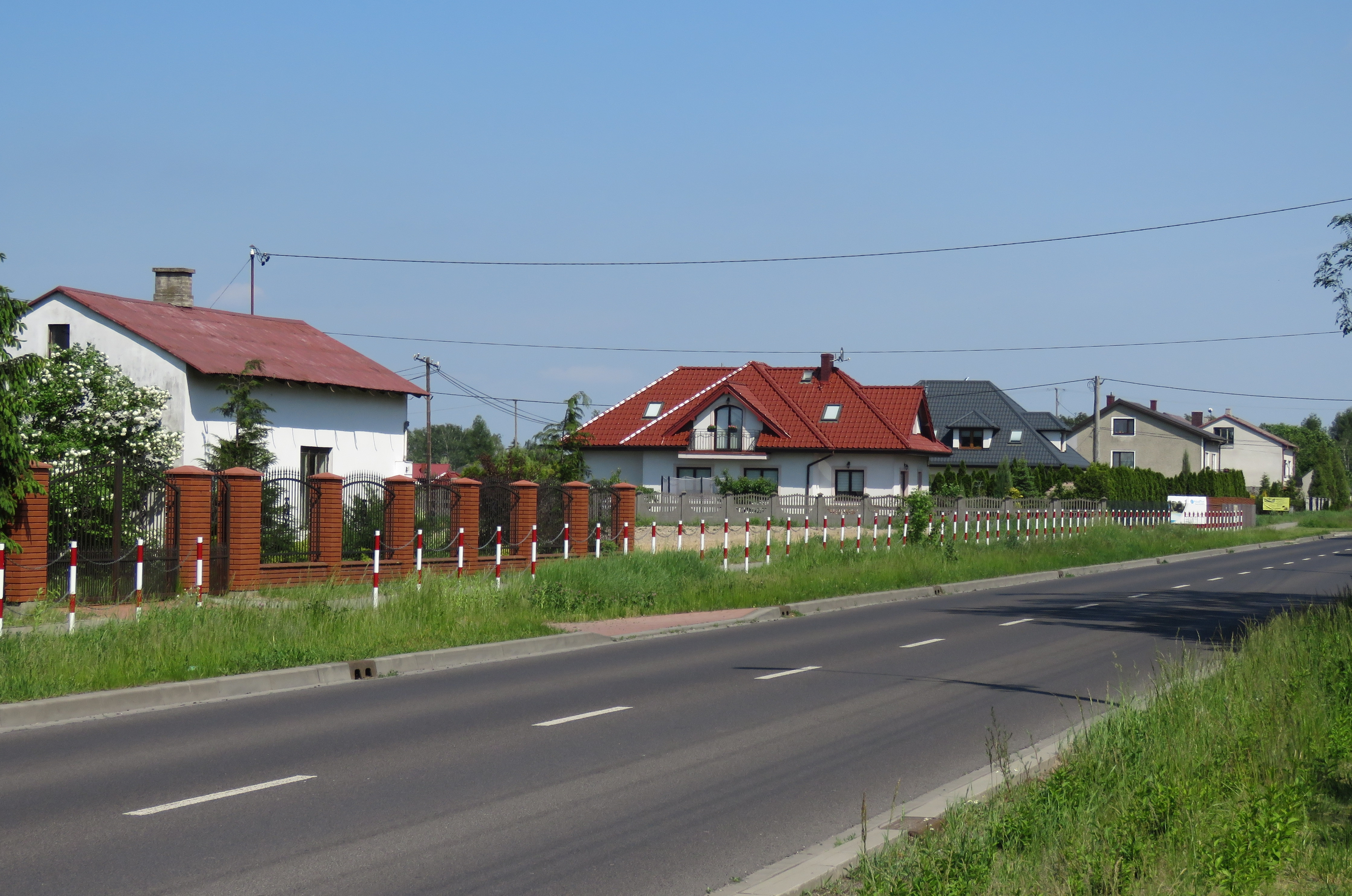
- Houses in Wilków

- Location within Poland
- Coordinates: 52°16′N 20°34′E
- Country: Poland
- Voivodeship: Masovian
- County: Warsaw West
- Gmina: Leszno

Wilków [ˈvilkuf] is a village in the administrative district of Gmina Leszno, within Warsaw West County, Masovian Voivodeship, in east-central Poland.
