= Kępiaste, Warsaw West County =

Kępiaste
- Village
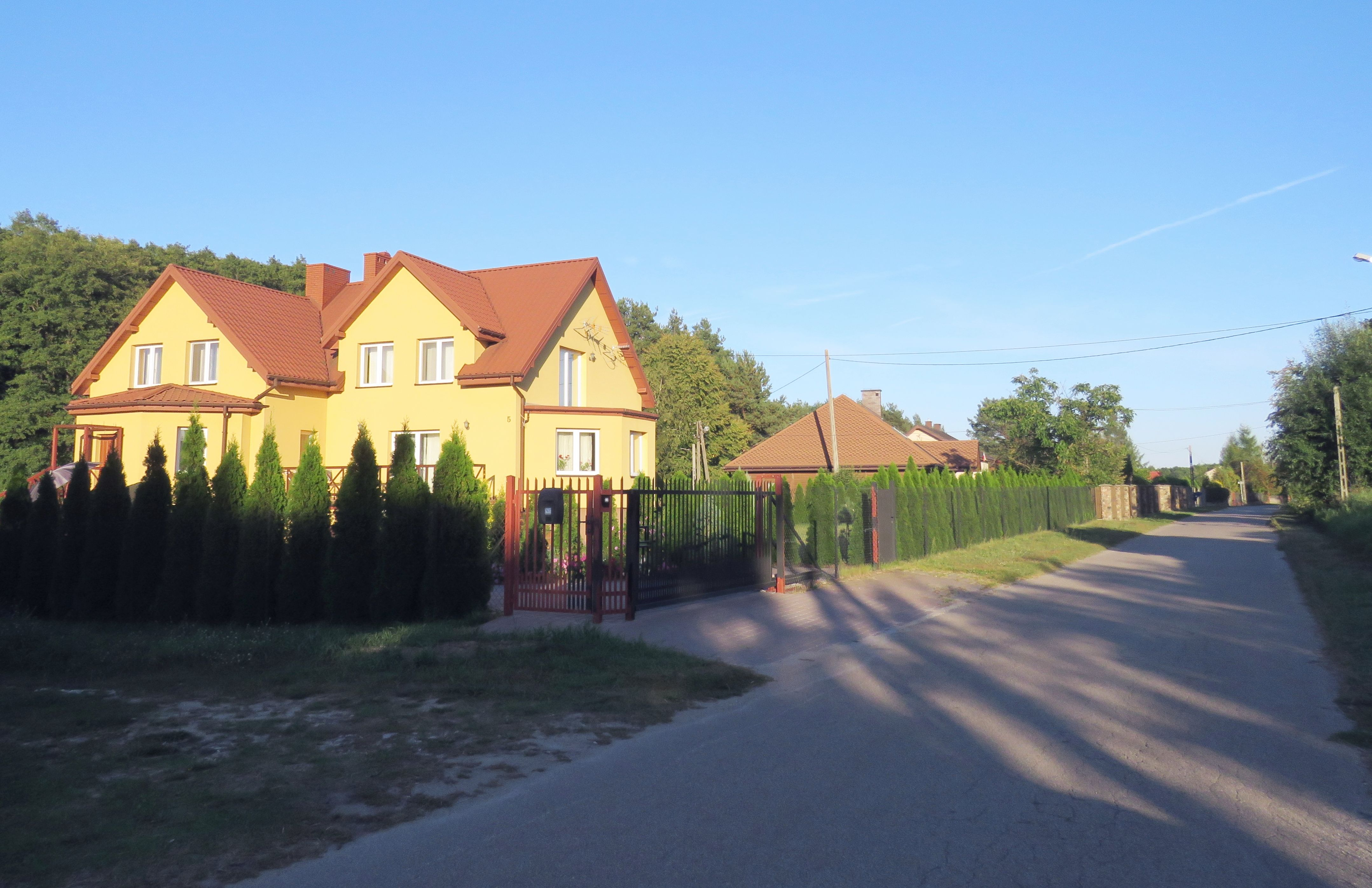
- Houses in Kępiaste

- Location within Poland
- Coordinates: 52°17′N 20°37′E
- Country: Poland
- Voivodeship: Masovian
- County: Warsaw West
- Gmina: Leszno

Kępiaste [kɛmˈpjastɛ] is a village in the administrative district of Gmina Leszno, within Warsaw West County, Masovian Voivodeship, in east-central Poland.
