= Bieliki =

- Village
- Location within Poland
- Coordinates: 51°11′N 19°18′E
- Country: Poland
- Voivodeship: Łódź
- County: Pajęczno
- Gmina: Sulmierzyce

Bieliki [bjɛˈliki] is a village in the administrative district of Gmina Sulmierzyce, within Pajęczno County, Łódź Voivodeship, in central Poland.
