= Stanisławów, Pajęczno County =

Stanisławów
- Village
- Location within Poland
- Coordinates: 51°12′16″N 19°12′28″E
- Country: Poland
- Voivodeship: Łódź
- County: Pajęczno
- Gmina: Sulmierzyce

Stanisławów [staniˈswavuf] is a village in the administrative district of Gmina Sulmierzyce, within Pajęczno County, Łódź Voivodeship, in central Poland.
