= Roztoka, Masovian Voivodeship =

Roztoka
- Village
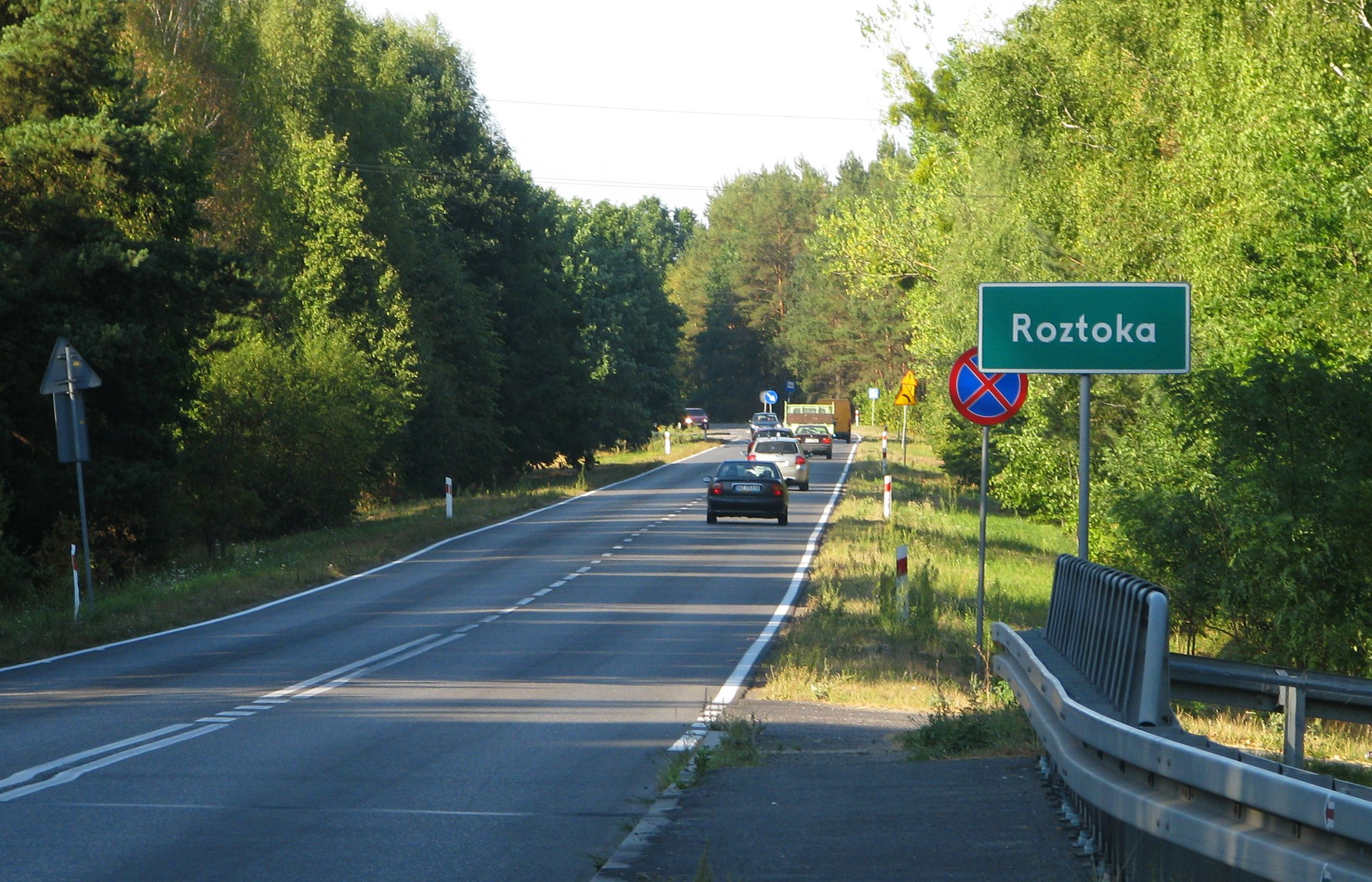
- Entering Roztoka

- Location within Poland
- Coordinates: 52°19′N 20°37′E
- Country: Poland
- Voivodeship: Masovian
- County: Warsaw West
- Gmina: Leszno

Roztoka [rɔsˈtɔka] is a village in the administrative district of Gmina Leszno, within Warsaw West County, Masovian Voivodeship, in east-central Poland.
