= Wąsy-Wieś =

- Village
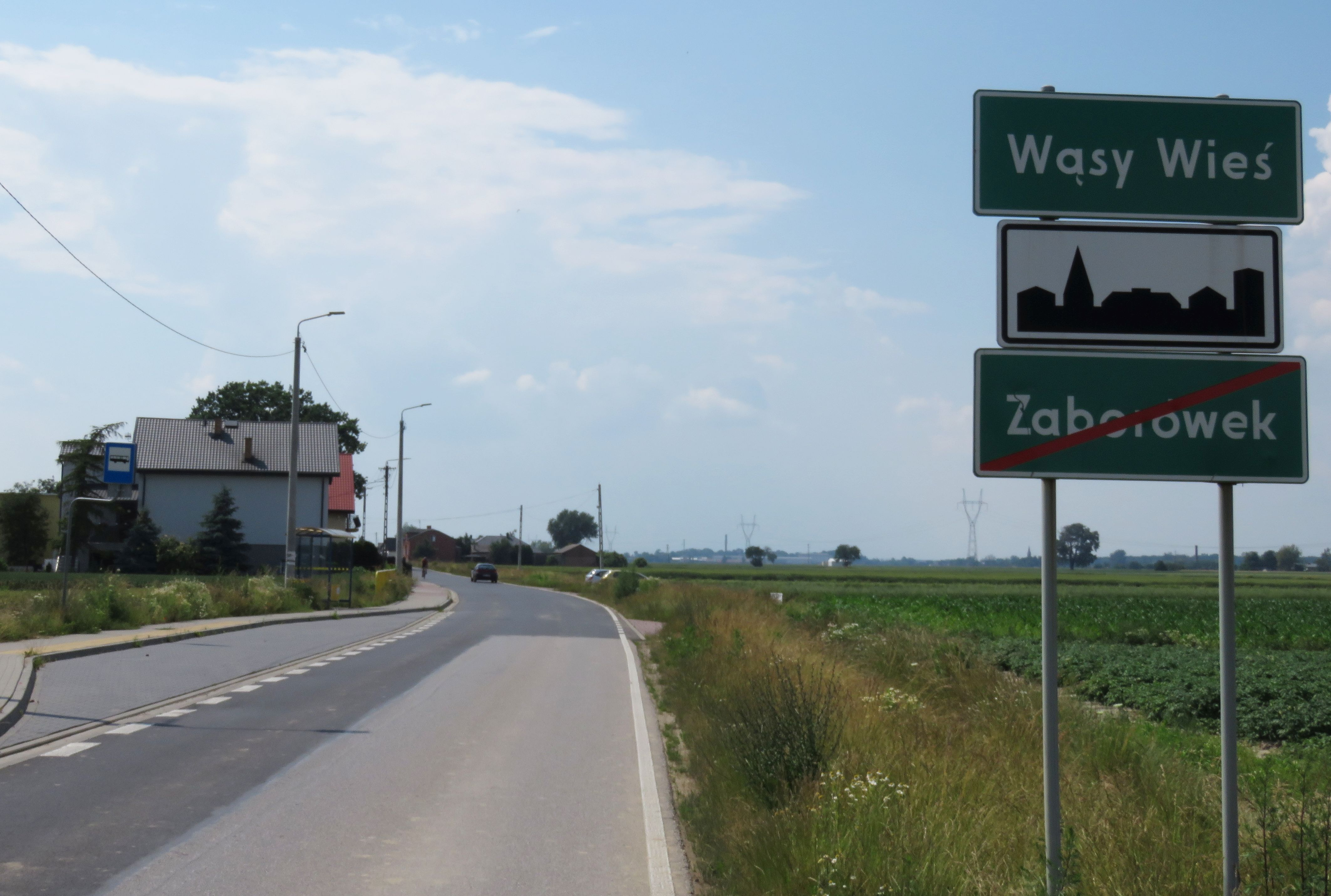
- Entering Wąsy-Wieś

- Location within Poland
- Coordinates: 52°14′35″N 20°38′16″E
- Country: Poland
- Voivodeship: Masovian
- County: Warsaw West
- Gmina: Leszno

Wąsy-Wieś [ˈvɔ̃sɨ ˈvjɛɕ] is a village in the administrative district of Gmina Leszno, within Warsaw West County, Masovian Voivodeship, in east-central Poland.
