= Czarnów-Towarzystwo =

- Village
- Location within Poland
- Coordinates: 52°14′45″N 20°32′57″E
- Country: Poland
- Voivodeship: Masovian
- County: Warsaw West
- Gmina: Leszno

Czarnów-Towarzystwo [ˈt͡ʂarnuf tɔvaˈʐɨstfɔ] is a village in the administrative district of Gmina Leszno, within Warsaw West County, Masovian Voivodeship, in east-central Poland.
