= Sulmierzyce, Łódź Voivodeship =

Sulmierzyce
- Village
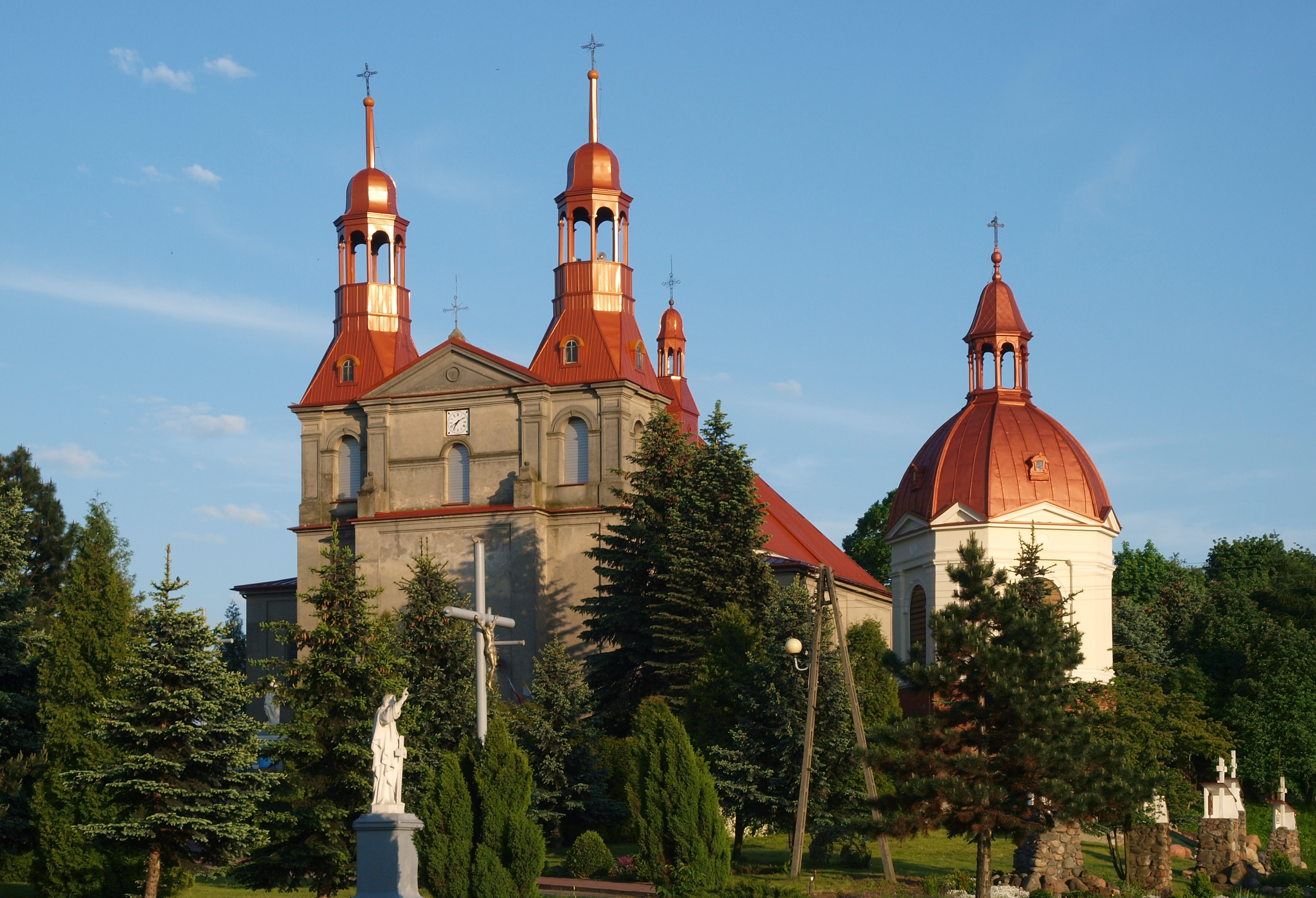
- Church of Saint Erasmus

- Location within Poland
- Coordinates: 51°11′0″N 19°11′31″E
- Country: Poland
- Voivodeship: Łódź
- County: Pajęczno
- Gmina: Sulmierzyce

Population
  - Total: 1,400

Sulmierzyce [sulmjɛˈʐɨt͡sɛ] is a village in Pajęczno County, Łódź Voivodeship, in central Poland. It is the seat of the gmina (administrative district) called Gmina Sulmierzyce.
