= Wiśniów, Łódź Voivodeship =

Wiśniów
- Village
- Location within Poland
- Coordinates: 51°12′58″N 19°09′40″E
- Country: Poland
- Voivodeship: Łódź
- County: Pajęczno
- Gmina: Sulmierzyce

Wiśniów [ˈviɕɲuf] is a village in the administrative district of Gmina Sulmierzyce, within Pajęczno County, Łódź Voivodeship, in central Poland.
