= Szymanówek, Warsaw West County =

Szymanówek
- Village
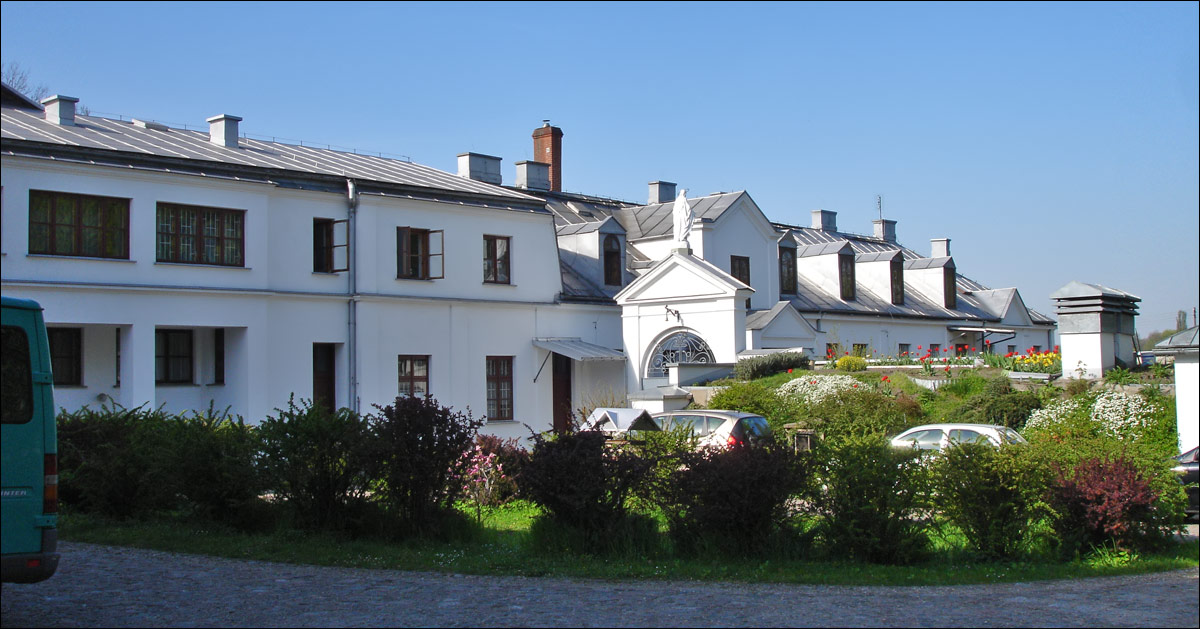
- Gymnasium in Szymanówek

- Location within Poland
- Coordinates: 52°16′26″N 20°33′17″E
- Country: Poland
- Voivodeship: Masovian
- County: Warsaw West
- Gmina: Leszno

Szymanówek (Polish pronunciation: [ʂɨmaˈnuvɛk]) is a village in the administrative district of Gmina Leszno, within Warsaw West County, Masovian Voivodeship, in east-central Poland.
