= Nowa Wieś, Pajęczno County =

Nowa Wieś
- Village
- Location within Poland
- Coordinates: 51°12′41″N 19°10′17″E
- Country: Poland
- Voivodeship: Łódź
- County: Pajęczno
- Gmina: Sulmierzyce
- Population: 90

Nowa Wieś [ˈnɔva ˈvjɛɕ] is a village in the administrative district of Gmina Sulmierzyce, within Pajęczno County, Łódź Voivodeship, in central Poland.
