= Sulmierzyce-Kolonia =

- Village
- Location within Poland
- Coordinates: 51°11′19″N 19°12′20″E
- Country: Poland
- Voivodeship: Łódź
- County: Pajęczno
- Gmina: Sulmierzyce

Sulmierzyce-Kolonia [sulmjɛˈʐɨt͡sɛ kɔˈlɔɲa] is a village in the administrative district of Gmina Sulmierzyce, within Pajęczno County, Łódź Voivodeship, in central Poland.
