= Wola Wydrzyna =

- Village
- Location within Poland
- Coordinates: 51°12′12″N 19°08′49″E
- Country: Poland
- Voivodeship: Łódź
- County: Pajęczno
- Gmina: Sulmierzyce

Wola Wydrzyna [ˈvɔla vɨˈdʐɨna] is a village in the administrative district of Gmina Sulmierzyce, within Pajęczno County, Łódź Voivodeship, in central Poland.
