= Korfowe =

- Village
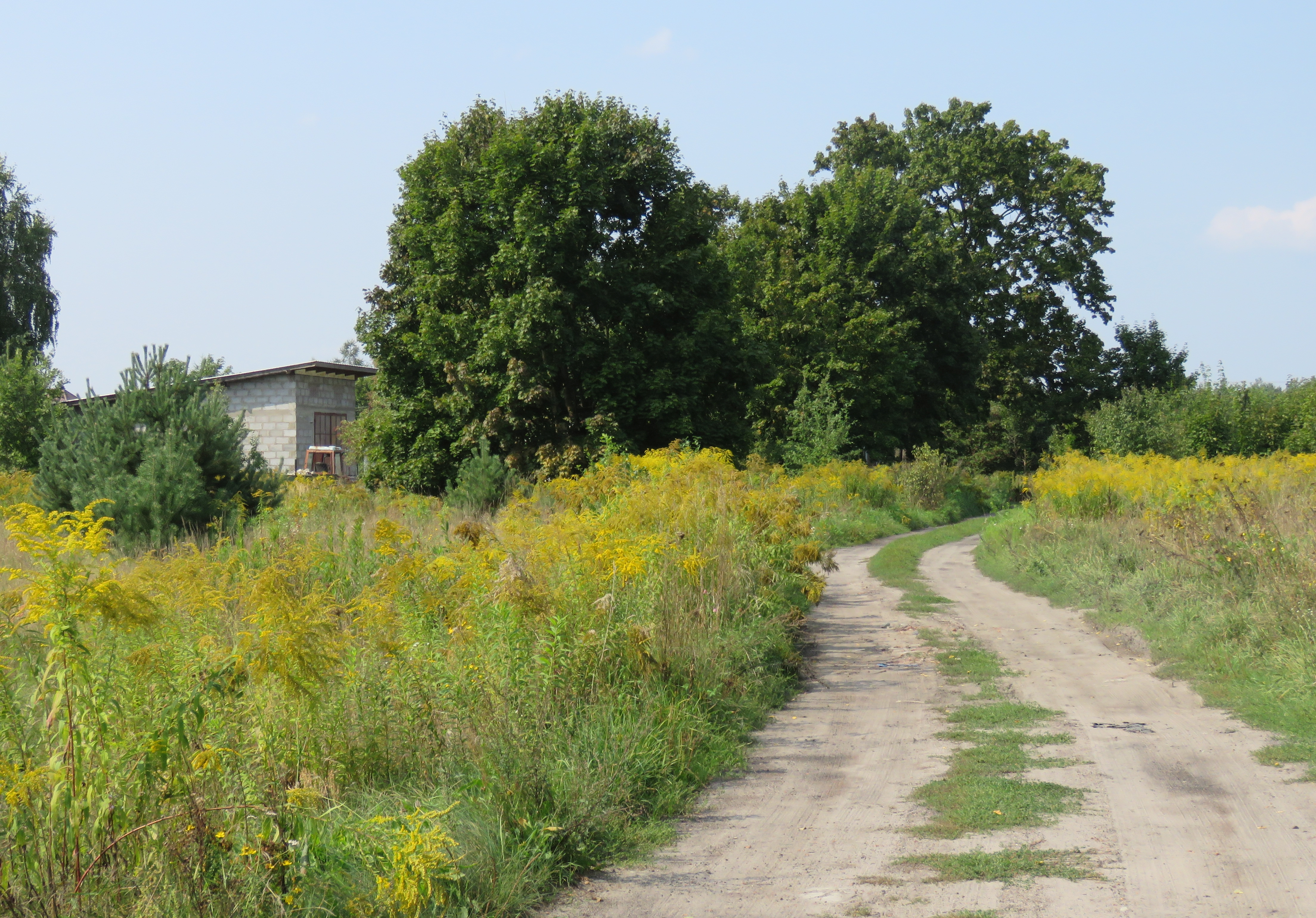
- Path through Korfowe

- Location within Poland
- Coordinates: 52°16′50″N 20°31′10″E
- Country: Poland
- Voivodeship: Masovian
- County: Warsaw West
- Gmina: Leszno

Korfowe [kɔrˈfɔvɛ] is a village in the administrative district of Gmina Leszno, within Warsaw West County, Masovian Voivodeship, in east-central Poland.
