= Gmina Sulmierzyce =

Gmina Sulmierzyce Sulmierzyce Commune
- Gmina
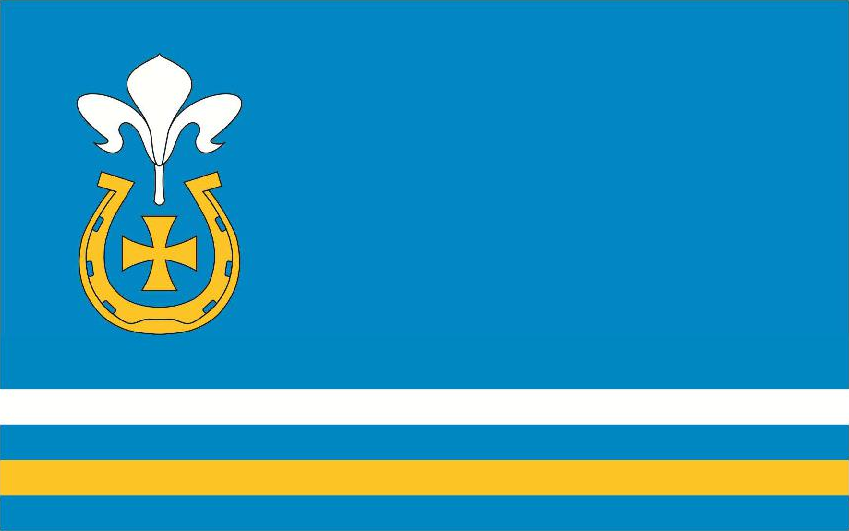
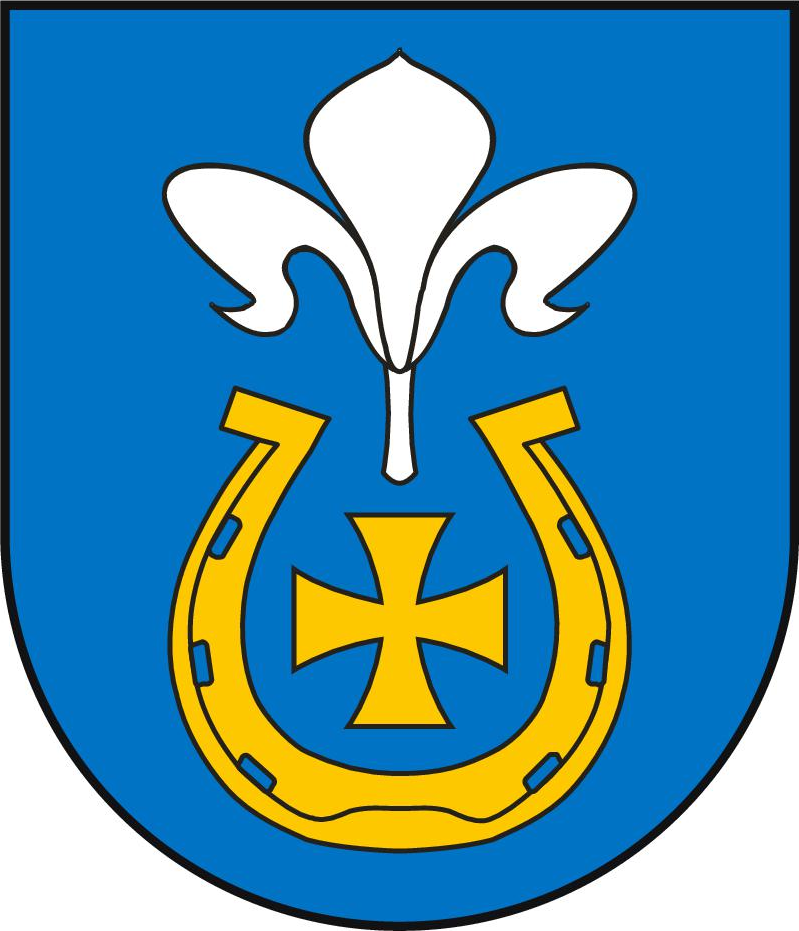
- Flag Coat of arms
- Interactive map of Gmina Sulmierzyce
- Coordinates (Sulmierzyce): 51°11′0″N 19°11′31″E
- Country: Poland
- Voivodeship: Łódź
- County: Pajęczno
- Seat: Sulmierzyce

Area
  - Total: 82.72 km^{2} (31.94 sq mi)

Population (2006)
  - Total: 4,757
  - Density: 57.51/km^{2} (148.9/sq mi)

Gmina Sulmierzyce is a rural gmina (administrative district) in Pajęczno County, Łódź Voivodeship, in central Poland. Its seat is the village of Sulmierzyce, which lies approximately 14 kilometres (9 mi) east of Pajęczno and 70 km (43 mi) south of the regional capital Łódź.

The gmina covers an area of 82.72 square kilometres (31.9 sq mi), and as of 2006 its total population is 4,757.

== Villages ==
Gmina Sulmierzyce contains the villages and settlements of Anielów, Bieliki, Bogumiłowice, Chorzenice, Dąbrowa, Dąbrówka, Dworszowice Pakoszowe, Eligiów, Filipowizna, Kąty, Kodrań, Ksawerów, Kuźnica, Łęczyska, Marcinów, Markowizna, Nowa Wieś, Ostrołęka, Patyków, Piekary, Stanisławów, Sulmierzyce, Sulmierzyce-Kolonia, Trzciniec, Wiśniów, Wola Wydrzyna and Złotniki.

== Neighbouring gminas ==
Gmina Sulmierzyce is bordered by the gminas of Kleszczów, Lgota Wielka, Pajęczno, Rząśnia, Strzelce Wielkie and Szczerców.
