= Wyględy =

- Village
- Location within Poland
- Coordinates: 52°15′N 20°43′E
- Country: Poland
- Voivodeship: Masovian
- County: Warsaw West
- Gmina: Leszno
- Population: 203

Wyględy [vɨˈɡlɛndɨ] is a village in the administrative district of Gmina Leszno, within Warsaw West County, Masovian Voivodeship, in east-central Poland.
