= Leszno, Warsaw West County =

Leszno
- Village
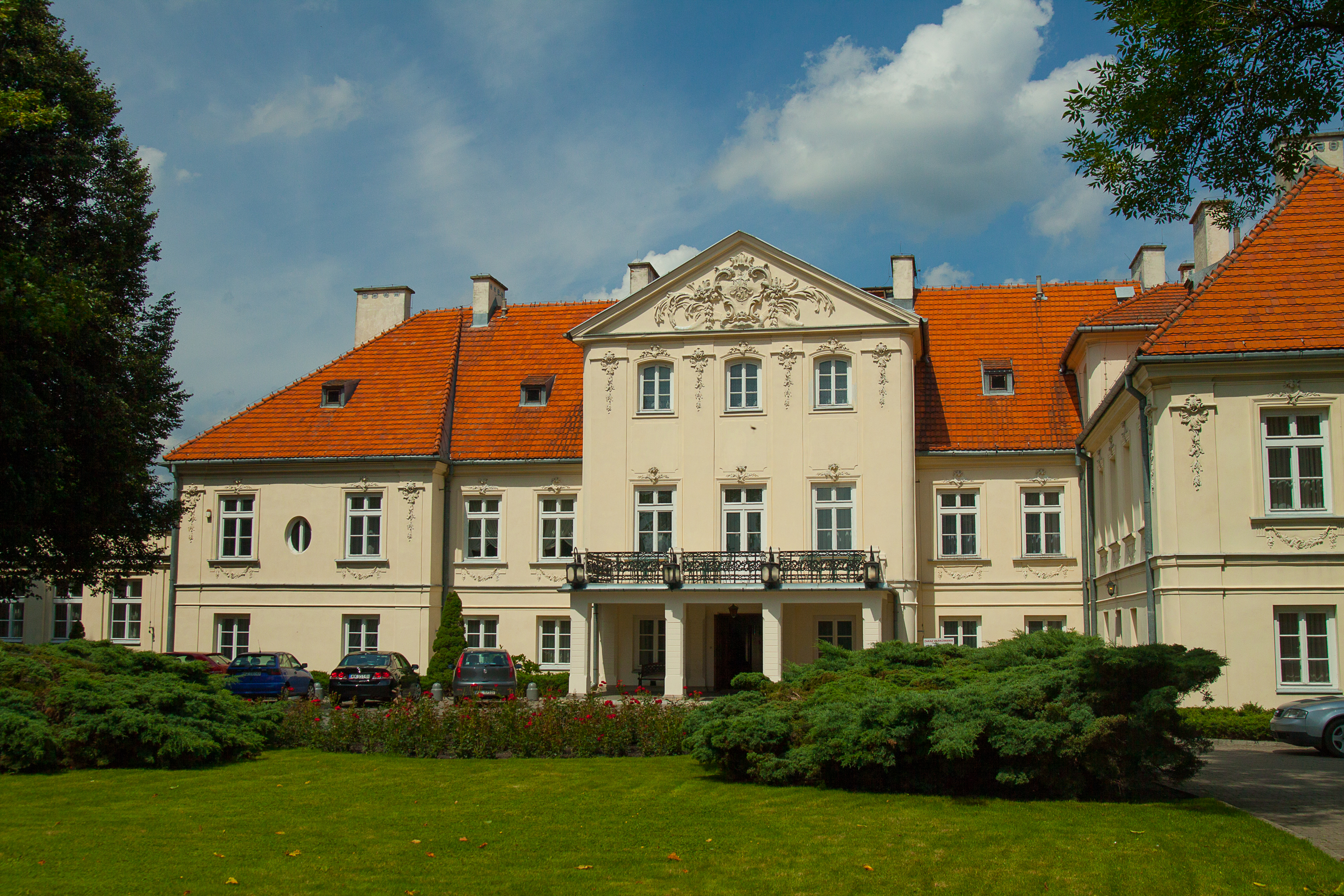
- Łuszczewski Palace in Leszno

- Coat of arms

- Location within Poland
- Coordinates: 52°16′N 20°36′E
- Country: Poland
- Voivodeship: Masovian
- County: Warsaw West
- Gmina: Leszno

Population
  - Total: 3,500
- Time zone: UTC+1 (CET)
  - Summer (DST): UTC+2 (CEST)
- Postal code: 05-084
- Vehicle registration: WZ
- Primary airport: Warsaw Chopin Airport
- Website: http://www.gminaleszno.pl/

Leszno [ˈlɛʂnɔ] is a village in Warsaw West County, Masovian Voivodeship, in east-central Poland. It is the seat of the gmina (administrative district) called Gmina Leszno.

Polish professional footballer Robert Lewandowski grew up in Leszno. In 2016 he became an honorary citizen of Leszno.

== History ==
Ancient Roman coins – denarii of emperors Trajan and Hadrian – have been found in Leszno.

The history of Leszno dates back to the Middle Ages. It was mentioned in documents in 1423. It was owned by various families, including the Łuszczewski family, which built a Baroque palace, which is the main landmark of the village.

In the mid-19th century, a sugar factory was established in the village, the first in Poland equipped with a steam turbine.

Several men from Leszno died in various battles against the invading Russians during the Polish–Soviet War of 1919–1920. A memorial to those soldiers is located in the local Catholic Church of Saint John the Baptist.

During the invasion of Poland, which started World War II, in early September 1939, the Germans captured Leszno. On September 16, Poles recaptured the village for tactical purposes, while the Germans retreated in panic. On September 17, the Germans occupied Leszno again, and carried out a massacre of around 50 inhabitants in an act of revenge. Many men were transported to Błonie, from where they were to be deported to forced labor to Germany, but some managed to escape. About 70% of the village was burned down.

== Sights ==
The main landmark of Leszno is the Baroque Łuszczewski Palace with an adjacent park. There are two historic churches, one Catholic and one Mariavite. In the village there is also a monument commemorating Polish soldiers, partisans and inhabitants killed during World War II.

== Sports ==
The local football club is Partyzant Leszno. Robert Lewandowski took his first steps in football in the club. It competes in the lower leagues.

== Gallery ==
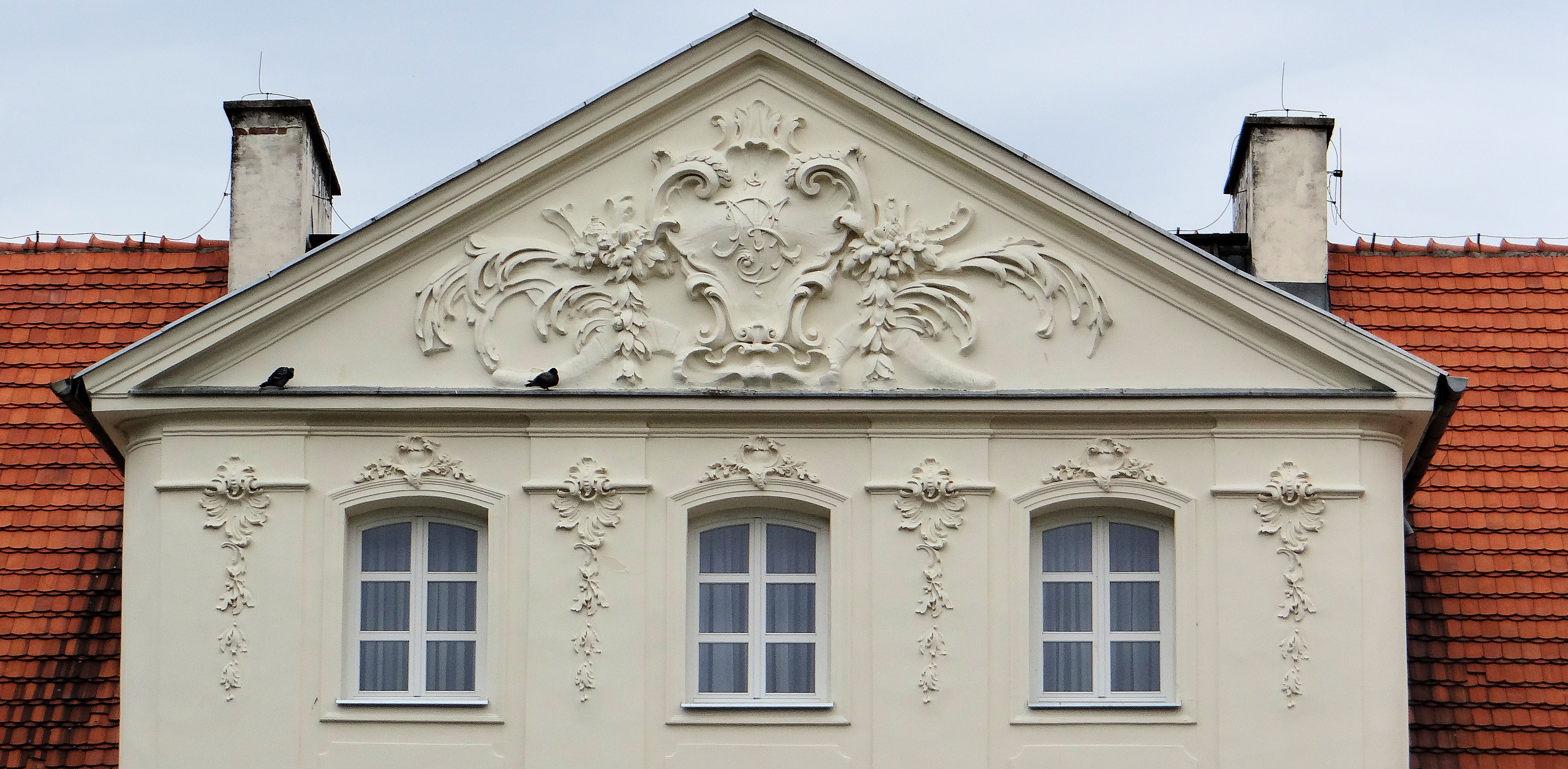
Architectural decorations on the facade of the Łuszczewski Palace

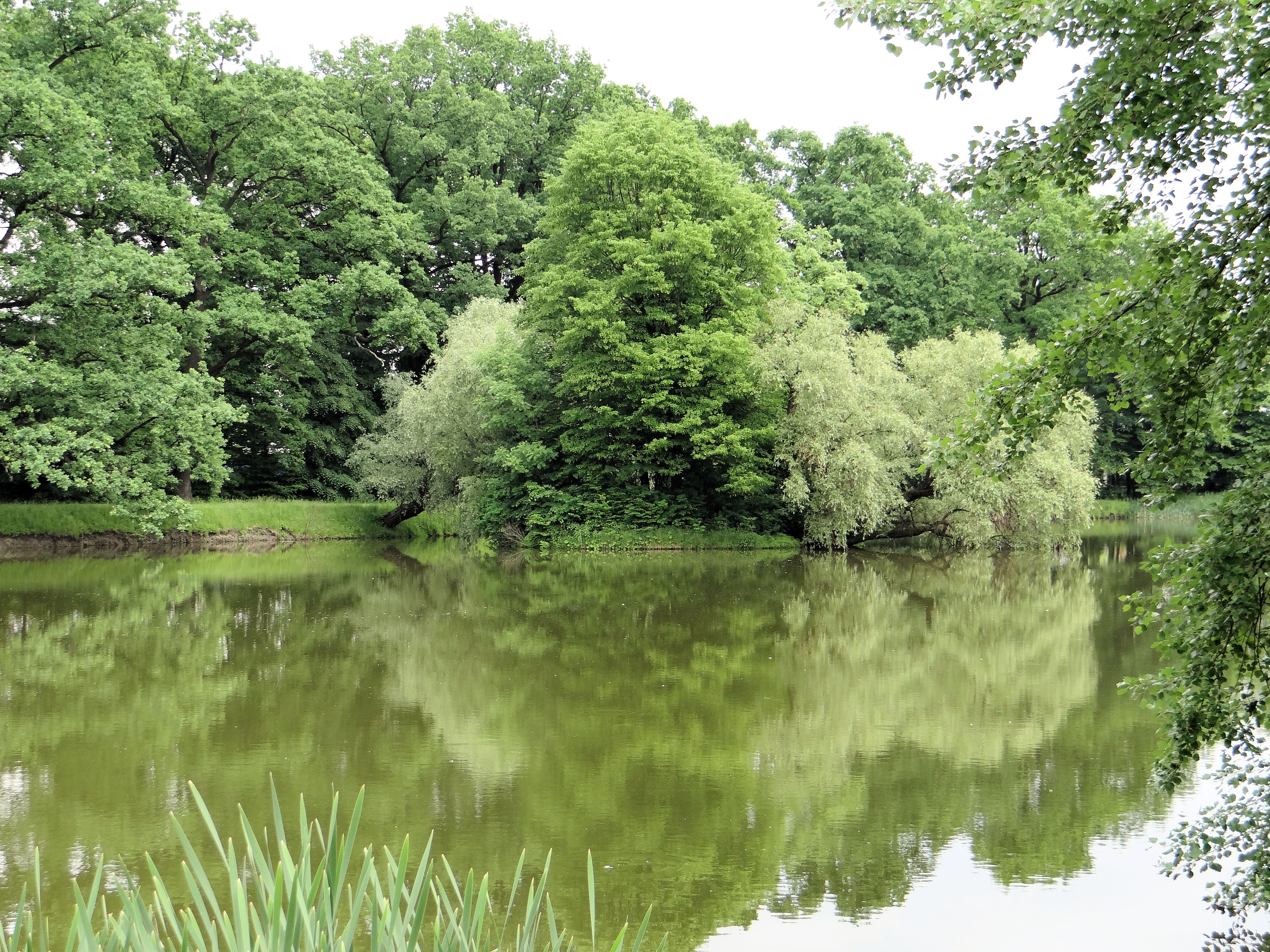
Park

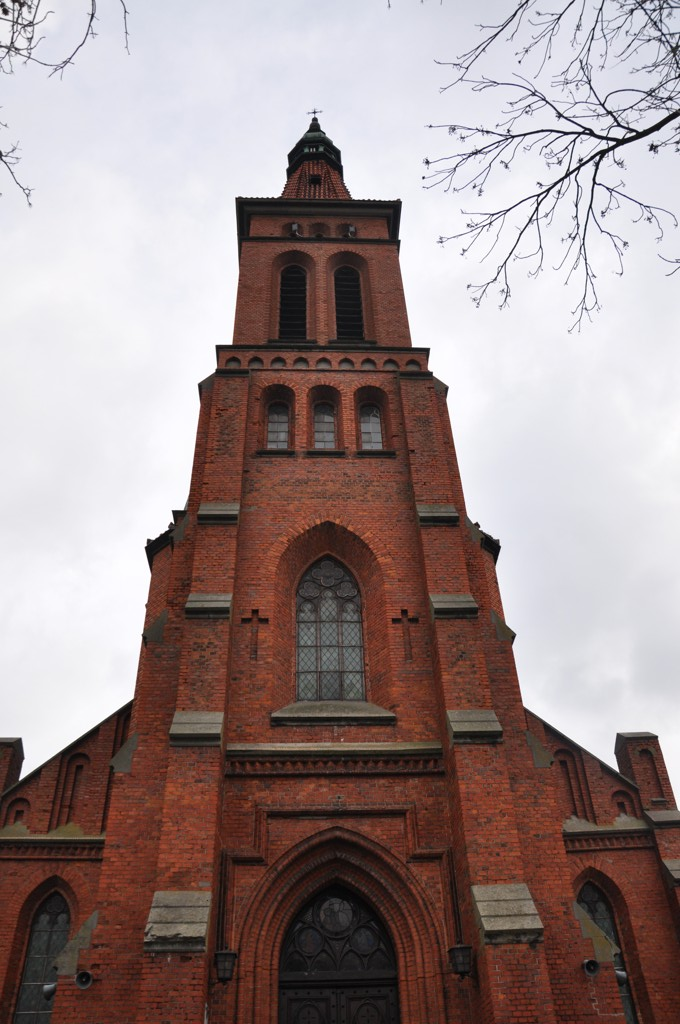
Saint John the Baptist church

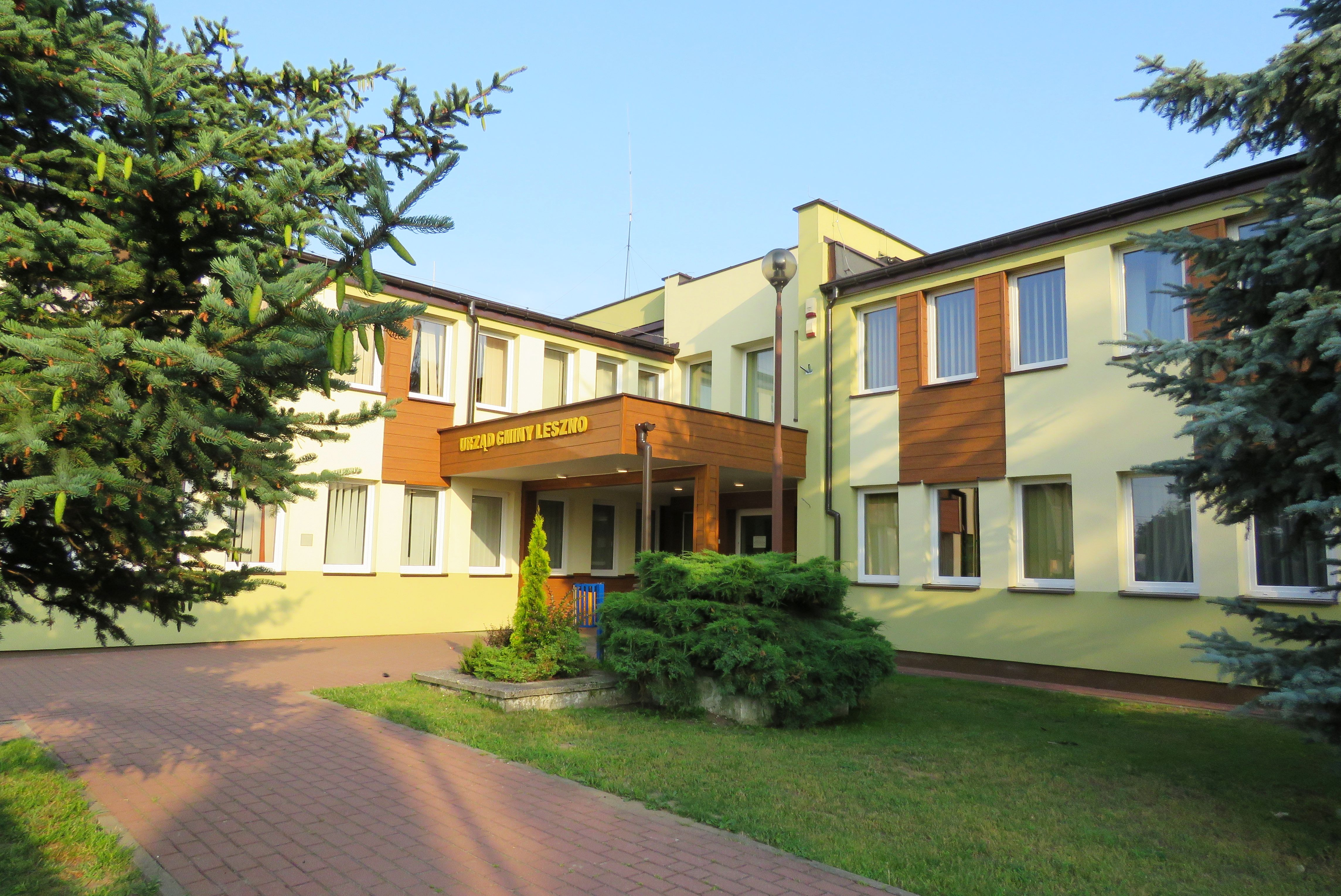
Gmina office
