= Marcinów, Pajęczno County =

Marcinów
- Village
- Location within Poland
- Coordinates: 51°11′20″N 19°16′27″E
- Country: Poland
- Voivodeship: Łódź
- County: Pajęczno
- Gmina: Sulmierzyce

Marcinów [marˈt͡ɕinuf] is a village in the administrative district of Gmina Sulmierzyce, within Pajęczno County, Łódź Voivodeship, in central Poland.
