= Piekary, Pajęczno County =

Piekary
- Village
- Location within Poland
- Coordinates: 51°11′N 19°10′E
- Country: Poland
- Voivodeship: Łódź
- County: Pajęczno
- Gmina: Sulmierzyce

Piekary [pjɛˈkarɨ] is a village in the administrative district of Gmina Sulmierzyce, within Pajęczno County, Łódź Voivodeship, in central Poland.
