= Patyków =

- Village
- Location within Poland
- Coordinates: 51°10′16″N 19°17′51″E
- Country: Poland
- Voivodeship: Łódź
- County: Pajęczno
- Gmina: Sulmierzyce

Patyków [paˈtɨkuf] is a village in the administrative district of Gmina Sulmierzyce, within Pajęczno County, Łódź Voivodeship, in central Poland.
