= Wiktorów, Warsaw West County =

Wiktorów
- Village
- Location within Poland
- Coordinates: 52°15′48″N 20°42′2″E
- Country: Poland
- Voivodeship: Masovian
- County: Warsaw West
- Gmina: Leszno

Wiktorów [vikˈtɔruf] is a village in the administrative district of Gmina Leszno, within Warsaw West County, Masovian Voivodeship, in east-central Poland.
