= Marianów, Warsaw West County =

Marianów
- Village
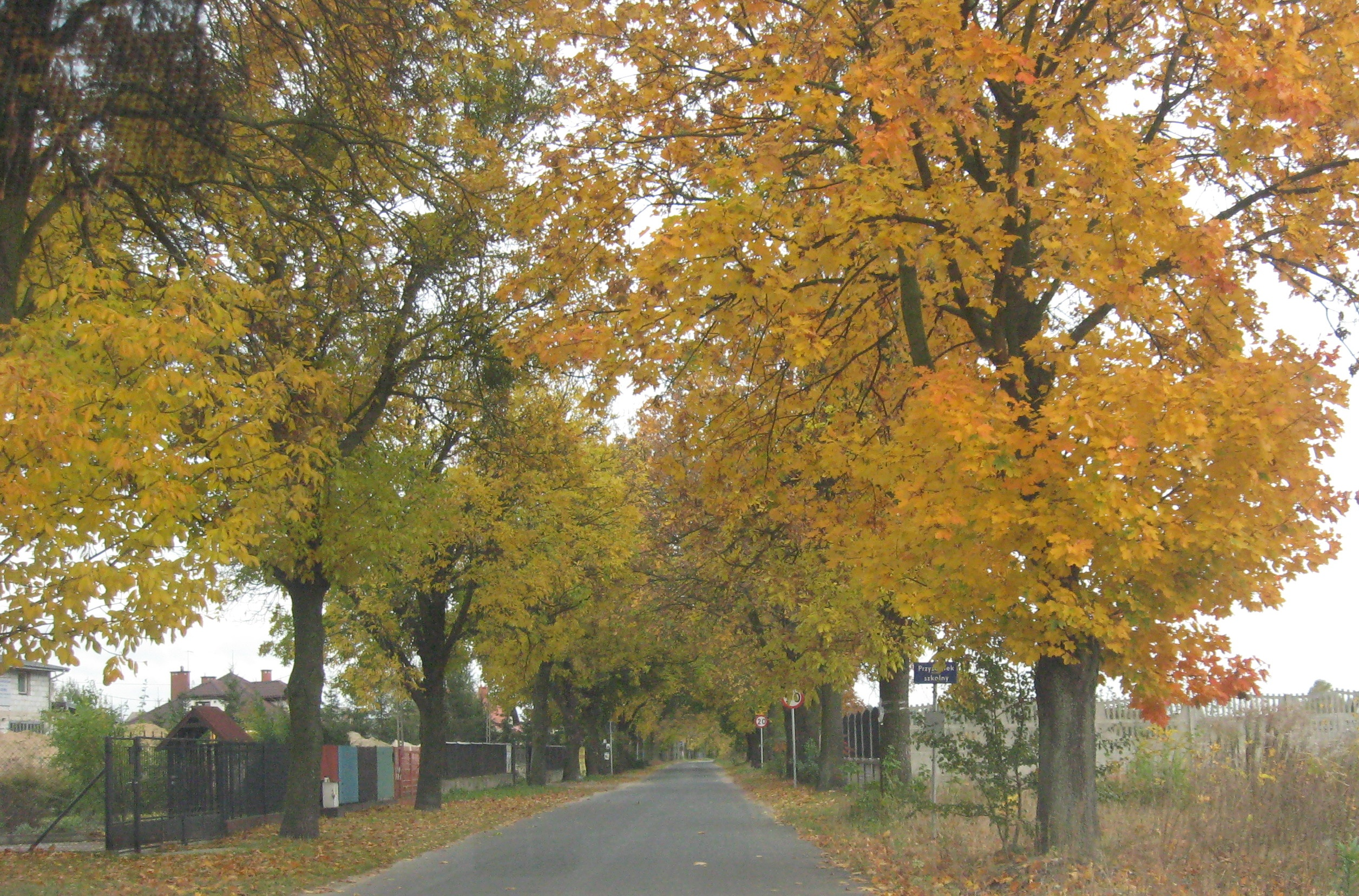
- Road through Marianów

- Location within Poland
- Coordinates: 52°15′53″N 20°34′12″E
- Country: Poland
- Voivodeship: Masovian
- County: Warsaw West
- Gmina: Leszno
- Time zone: UTC+1 (CET)
  - Summer (DST): UTC+2 (CEST)

Marianów [maˈrjanuf] is a village in the administrative district of Gmina Leszno, within Warsaw West County, Masovian Voivodeship, in east-central Poland.

Nine Polish citizens were murdered by Nazi Germany in the village during World War II.
