= Gawartowa Wola =

- Village
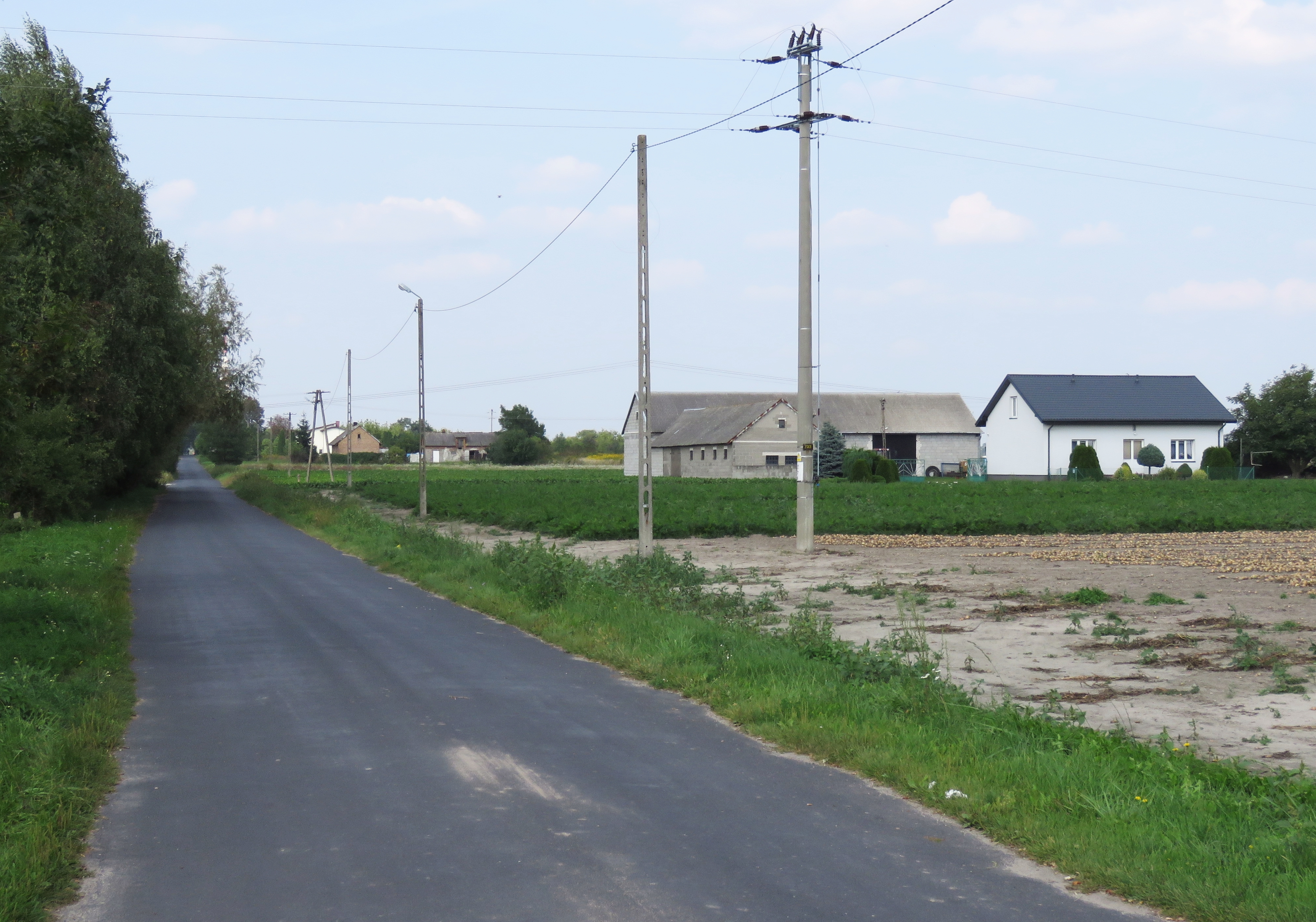
- Road through Gawartowa Wola

- Location within Poland
- Coordinates: 52°14′28″N 20°30′4″E
- Country: Poland
- Voivodeship: Masovian
- County: Warsaw West
- Gmina: Leszno
- Population: 270

Gawartowa Wola [ɡavarˈtɔva ˈvɔla] is a village in the administrative district of Gmina Leszno, within Warsaw West County, Masovian Voivodeship, in east-central Poland.
