= Dąbrówka, Pajęczno County =

Village in Gmina Sulmierzyce, Poland

Dąbrówka
- Village
- Location within Poland
- Coordinates: 51°12′14″N 19°13′30″E
- Country: Poland
- Voivodeship: Łódź
- County: Pajęczno
- Gmina: Sulmierzyce

Dąbrówka [dɔmˈbrufka] is a village in the administrative district of Gmina Sulmierzyce, within Pajęczno County, Łódź Voivodeship, in central Poland.
