= Zaborówek, Warsaw West County =

Zaborówek
- Village
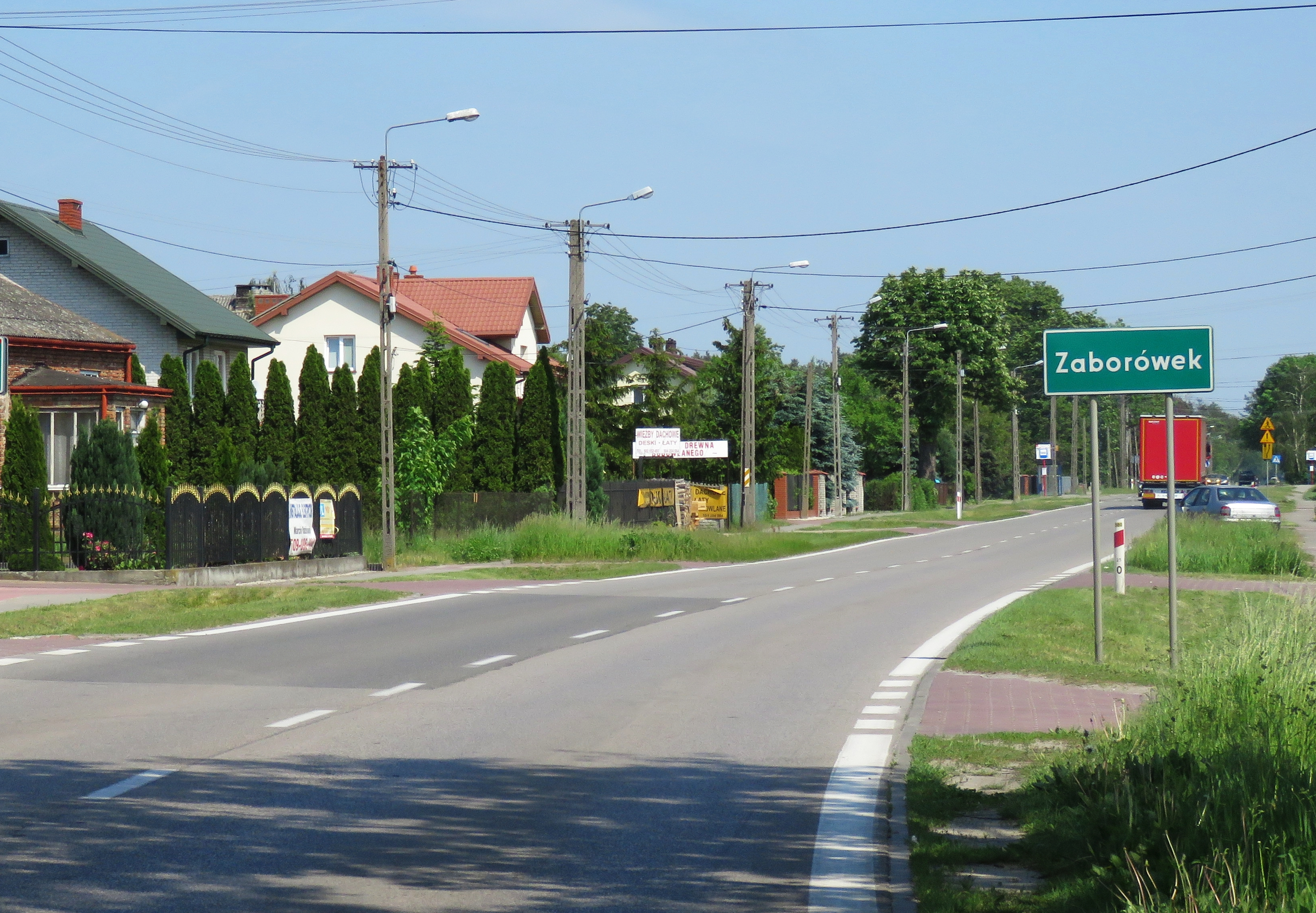
- Entering Zaborówek

- Location within Poland
- Coordinates: 52°15′41″N 20°37′22″E
- Country: Poland
- Voivodeship: Masovian
- County: Warsaw West
- Gmina: Leszno

Zaborówek [zabɔˈruvɛk] is a village in the administrative district of Gmina Leszno, within Warsaw West County, Masovian Voivodeship, in east-central Poland.
