= Gmina Leszno =

Gmina Leszno Leszno Commune
- Gmina
- Coat of arms

- Location of the gmina in Warsaw West County
- Coordinates (Leszno): 52°16′N 20°36′E
- Country: Poland
- Voivodeship: Masovian
- County: Warsaw West
- Seat: Leszno

Area
  - Total: 125.03 km^{2} (48.27 sq mi)

Population (2013)
  - Total: 9,987
  - Density: 79.88/km^{2} (206.9/sq mi)
- Website: http://www.gminaleszno.pl/

Gmina Leszno is a rural gmina (administrative district) in Warsaw West County, Masovian Voivodeship, in east-central Poland. Its seat is the village of Leszno, which lies approximately 15 kilometres (9 mi) west of Ożarów Mazowiecki and 28 km (17 mi) west of Warsaw.

The gmina covers an area of 125.03 square kilometres (48.3 sq mi), and as of 2006 its total population is 8,791 (9,987 in 2013).

== Villages ==
Gmina Leszno contains the villages and settlements of Czarnów, Czarnów-Towarzystwo, Feliksów, Gawartowa Wola, Grabina, Grądki, Grądy, Julinek, Kępiaste, Korfowe, Ławy, Leszno, Łubiec, Marianów, Plewniak, Podrochale, Powązki, Roztoka, Stelmachowo, Szadkówek, Szymanówek, Trzciniec, Walentów, Wąsy-Kolonia, Wąsy-Wieś, Wiktorów, Wilków, Wilkowa Wieś, Wólka, Wyględy, Zaborów and Zaborówek.

== Neighbouring gminas ==
Gmina Leszno is bordered by the gminas of Błonie, Czosnów, Izabelin, Kampinos, Leoncin, Ożarów Mazowiecki, Stare Babice and Teresin.
