= Kodrań, Gmina Sulmierzyce =

Village in Gmina Sulmierzyce, Poland

Kodrań
- Village
- Location within Poland
- Coordinates: 51°10′57″N 19°13′51″E
- Country: Poland
- Voivodeship: Łódź
- County: Pajęczno
- Gmina: Sulmierzyce

Kodrań [ˈkɔdraɲ] is a village in the administrative district of Gmina Sulmierzyce, within Pajęczno County, Łódź Voivodeship, in central Poland.
