= Chorzenice, Łódź Voivodeship =

Chorzenice
- Village
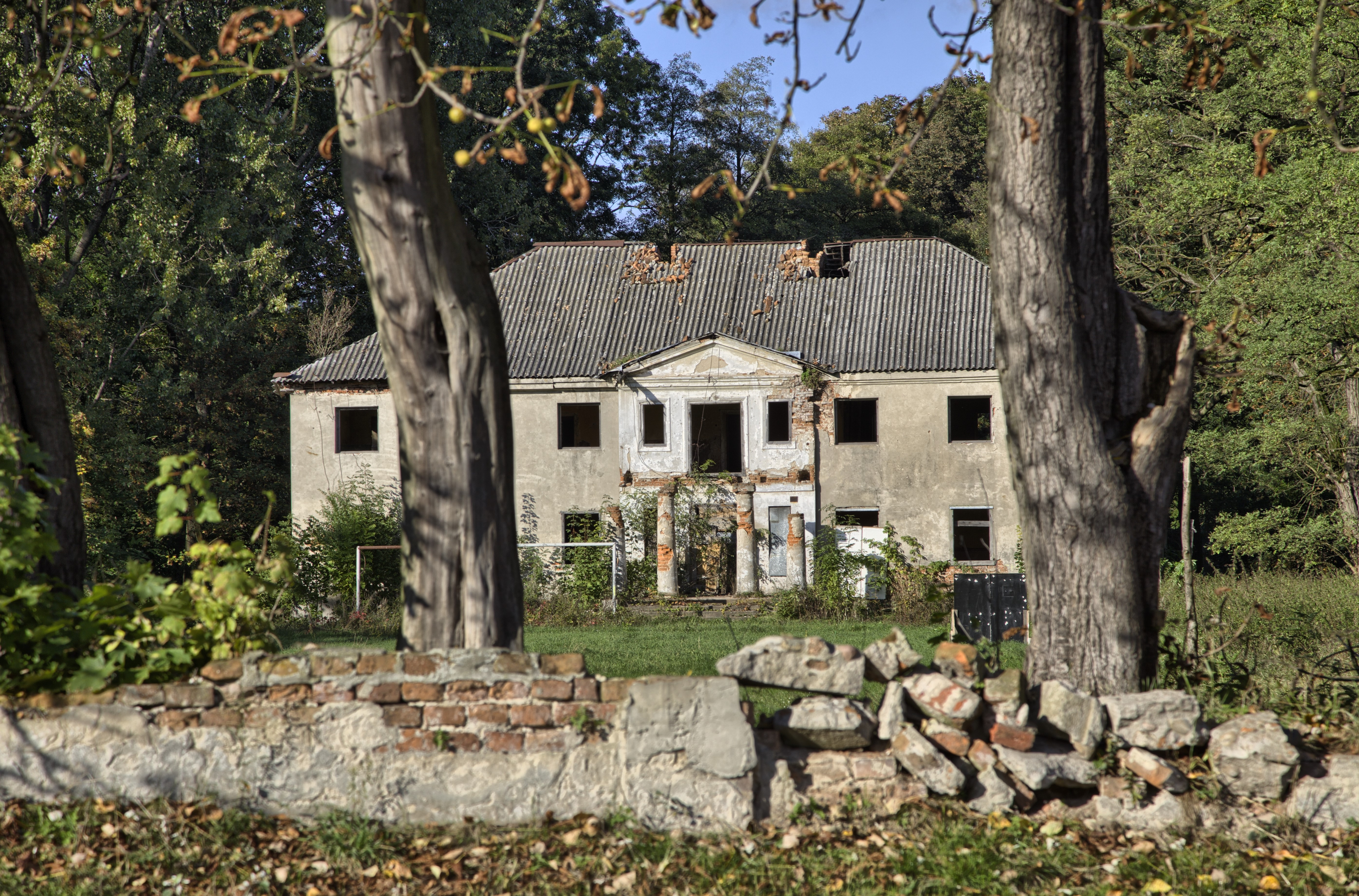
- 19th-century manor house in Chorzenice

- Location within Poland
- Coordinates: 51°11′24″N 19°15′07″E
- Country: Poland
- Voivodeship: Łódź
- County: Pajęczno
- Gmina: Sulmierzyce

Chorzenice [xɔʐɛˈnit͡sɛ] is a village in the administrative district of Gmina Sulmierzyce, within Pajęczno County, Łódź Voivodeship, in central Poland.
