= Feliksów, Warsaw West County =

Feliksów
- Village
- Location within Poland
- Coordinates: 52°15′11″N 20°41′6″E
- Country: Poland
- Voivodeship: Masovian
- County: Warsaw West
- Gmina: Leszno

Feliksów (Polish pronunciation: [fɛˈliksuf]) is a village in the administrative district of Gmina Leszno, within Warsaw West County, Masovian Voivodeship, in east-central Poland.
