= Kąty, Pajęczno County =

Kąty
- Village
- Location within Poland
- Coordinates: 51°10′25″N 19°16′43″E
- Country: Poland
- Voivodeship: Łódź
- County: Pajęczno
- Gmina: Sulmierzyce
- Population: 10

Kąty [ˈkɔntɨ] is a village in the administrative district of Gmina Sulmierzyce, within Pajęczno County, Łódź Voivodeship, in central Poland.
