= Grądki, Masovian Voivodeship =

Grądki
- Village
- Location within Poland
- Coordinates: 52°14′55″N 20°33′26″E
- Country: Poland
- Voivodeship: Masovian
- County: Warsaw West
- Gmina: Leszno

Grądki [ˈɡrɔntki] is a village in the administrative district of Gmina Leszno, within Warsaw West County, Masovian Voivodeship, in east-central Poland.
