= Trzciniec, Łódź Voivodeship =

Trzciniec
- Village
- Location within Poland
- Coordinates: 51°10′48″N 19°16′50″E
- Country: Poland
- Voivodeship: Łódź
- County: Pajęczno
- Gmina: Sulmierzyce

Trzciniec [ˈtʂt͡ɕiɲɛt͡s] is a village in the administrative district of Gmina Sulmierzyce, within Pajęczno County, Łódź Voivodeship, in central Poland.
