= Trzciniec, Warsaw West County =

Trzciniec
- Village
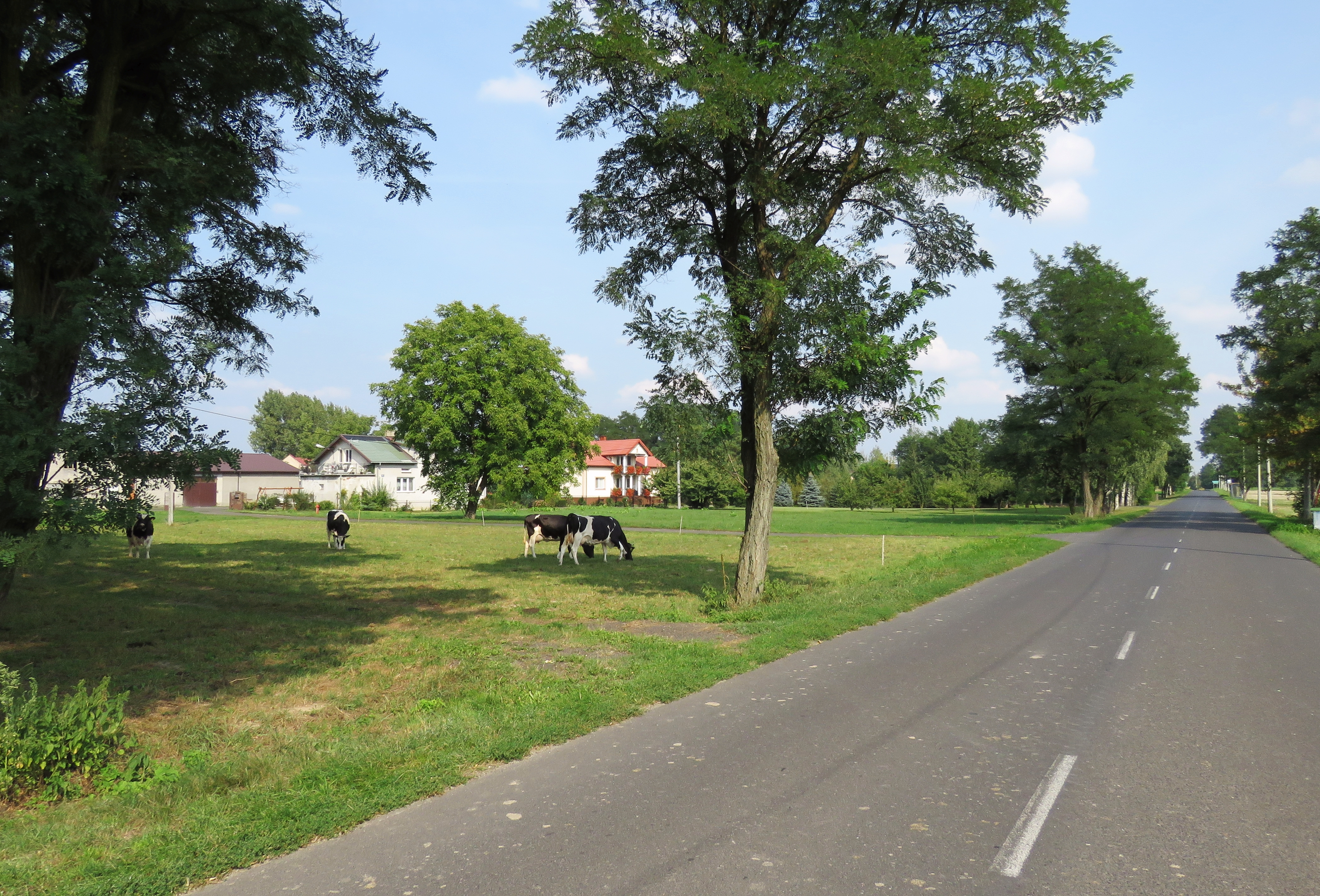
- Road through Trzciniec

- Location within Poland
- Coordinates: 52°14′36″N 20°28′36″E
- Country: Poland
- Voivodeship: Masovian
- County: Warsaw West
- Gmina: Leszno

Trzciniec [ˈtʂt͡ɕiɲɛt͡s] is a village in the administrative district of Gmina Leszno, within Warsaw West County, Masovian Voivodeship, in east-central Poland.
