= Markowizna, Łódź Voivodeship =

Markowizna
- Village
- Location within Poland
- Coordinates: 51°12′47″N 19°09′35″E
- Country: Poland
- Voivodeship: Łódź
- County: Pajęczno
- Gmina: Sulmierzyce

Markowizna [markɔˈvizna] is a village in the administrative district of Gmina Sulmierzyce, within Pajęczno County, Łódź Voivodeship, in central Poland.
