= Raid on Truskaw =

World War II attack

Coordinates: 52°18′26″N 20°46′03″E

- Part of Warsaw Uprising
Date	September 2/3, 1944
Location	Truskaw, Poland
Result	Polish victory
Territorial changes	Poland under German occupation (General Government)

Belligerents
Polish Underground State	Nazi Germany

Commanders and leaders
Adolf Pilch	unknown

Units involved
80 soldiers	up to 1,000 soldiers artillery battery

Casualties and losses
10 killed 10 wounded	91–250 killed 100 wounded from several to a dozen artillery
- Location within Poland

The Raid on Truskaw was a surprising attack on the battalion stationed in the village of Truskaw by the Kaminski Brigade, carried out on the night of 2/3 September 1944 by a detachment from the Kampinos Group led by Lieutenant Adolf Pilch, codenamed Dolina.

On 27 August 1944, the vicinity of Truskaw and Sieraków was occupied by units of the collaborating Kaminski Brigade, thus preventing communication between Home Army units in the Kampinos Forest and the insurgent Warsaw. The enemy soon began to attack the Polish outpost in nearby Pociecha. In this situation, commanding the "Palmiry-Młociny" Regiment, Lieutenant Dolina organized a night raid on the Kaminski troops stationed in Truskaw. With minimal losses of their own, the Poles completely defeated two enemy subunits, capturing large quantities of weapons and ammunition in the process. This success – combined with a successful Raid on Marianów the following night – forced the Kaminski Brigade to retreat from the southern outskirts of the Kampinos Forest.

== "Independent Republic of Kampinos" ==
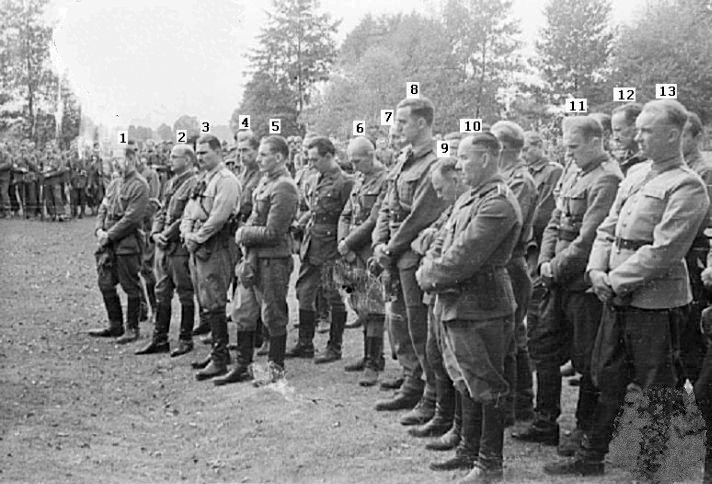
Officer corps of the Kampinos Group during a field mass in Wiersze. Visible in the photo are Major Okoń and Lieutenant Dolina

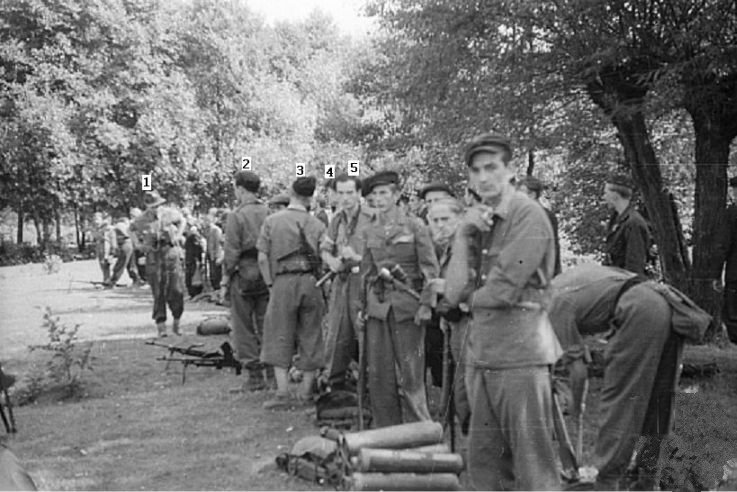
Soldiers of the Kampinos Group setting out to relieve Warsaw on 19 August 1944

After the outbreak of the Warsaw Uprising, fighting also spread to the northwest of the capital, in the Kampinos Forest. At that time, the structures of the Home Army from the pre-war gminas of Czosnów and Młociny, as well as from the eastern part of the Gmina Zaborów, were part of the VIII District Łęgi of the Warsaw County Subdistrict of the Warsaw District. This district was commanded by Captain Józef Krzyczkowski, codenamed Szymon. On the eve of the uprising, the Home Army units under his command could deploy two infantry battalions with the strength of five first-line companies. However, the weakness of these units lay in their armament. Captain Szymon estimated in his post-war memoirs that after the mobilization in July 1944, his district could muster only from 350 to 400 armed soldiers for combat. Fortunately for the Polish side, the balance of power in the Kampinos Forest changed dramatically at the end of July 1944 when the Stowbtsy-Naliboki Group arrived in Dziekanów Polski from the Naliboki forest in the Eastern Borderlands. It consisted of 861 well-armed soldiers, led by Lieutenant Adolf Pilch, codenamed Góra or Dolina – a Silent Unseen paratrooper, an experienced partisan who had been fighting against the Germans and Soviet partisans since autumn 1943. Initially, the Polish Underground State received Dolina and his soldiers with great mistrust due to accusations of collaboration with the Germans. (Note: The Stowbtsy-Naliboki Group was organized based on the Polish Partisan Unit, which was formed in June 1943 in the Stowbtsy County in Nowogródek. In the first months of its existence, the unit fought against the Germans, cooperating with Soviet partisans. However, in December 1943, the Soviets treacherously abducted the leadership of the Polish group and then began to disarm and liquidate the subunits deprived of officers. The new commander of the group, Lieutenant Adolf Pilch, codenamed "Góra", wanting to save the remnants of the unit and provide protection to the Polish population from the terror of the Soviet partisans, decided, with the consent of the command of the Nowogródek District of the Home Army, to enter into a temporary ceasefire with the Germans. This decision allowed "Góra" to both rebuild the group and continue fighting the Soviets. In anticipation of the approaching Red Army, "Góra" decided at the end of June 1944 to evacuate his units to the central regions of Poland (Koszada (2007, pp. 23–26)).) However, the Home Army High Command eventually agreed to incorporate the Naliboki group into the VIII District.

On 3 August 1944, based on the units of the VIII District and the Stowbtsy-Naliboki Group, the Palmiry-Młociny Regiment was formed, commanded by Lieutenant Dolina. After the outbreak of the uprising in the Kampinos Forest, small Home Army units from various districts of Warsaw also appeared, leaving the city after the failure of the initial Polish attacks during "W" Hour. Gradually, units from other regions and districts of the Warsaw District, as well as from the neighboring Western Sub-District of the Warsaw Area of the Home Army, also arrived there. Based on these units, a partisan formation called the Kampinos Group was created. At its peak, it numbered about 2,700 soldiers and 700 horses.

The actions of the Kampinos Group did not change the fate of the uprising. After unsuccessful attacks on the Bielany airfield (from 1 to 2 August 1944), Polish units had to temporarily withdraw deeper into the Kampinos Forest. Meanwhile, the Home Army command, which had high hopes for the presence of a strong partisan group in the immediate vicinity of Warsaw, directed Major Alfons Kotowski, codenamed Okoń, to the forest, instructing him to organize relief for the capital and then carry out vigorous offensive actions towards Powązki. Okoń reached the Kampinos Group on the night of August 15/16. However, before this happened, there was chaos in the command of the forest units, which would profoundly affect the actions of the Polish group. Due to mutual disagreements and indecision among Home Army commanders, it was not possible to organize an attack on the rear of the German Battle Group Reinefarth. Ultimately, nearly 1,000 soldiers of the Kampinos Group crossed into Żoliborz, where they were intended to be used to break through the German barrier separating this district from the Old Town. However, two night attacks on the heavily fortified Warszawa Gdańska Station ended in defeat and the loss of nearly 500 soldiers (August 20/21 and August 21/22). After the failed assaults, some of the "forest" soldiers returned with Major Okoń to the Kampinos Forest, while others remained in Żoliborz. Along with the soldiers of the Kampinos Group, a certain number of insurgents, including primarily the 100-strong company of the Jerzyki Group under the command of Lieutenant Jerzy Strzałkowski, codenamed Jerzy, left the city.

Upon returning from Warsaw, Major Okoń brought with him an order signed by General Tadeusz Pełczyński, codenamed Robak, confirming that Okoń was in charge of all Home Army units in the Kampinos Forest. In the same order, the Chief of Staff of the Home Army Headquarters also assigned new tasks to the Kampinos Group. Essentially, they had a passive character and did not involve conducting major diversionary actions behind the German lines fighting in Warsaw. According to General Pełczyński's order, the tasks of the forest units were to:

- organize a supply base for insurgent Warsaw;
- organize deliveries of weapons, ammunition, food, and equipment to the fighting capital;
- expand the drop-off reception base, used to receive weapon drops and supplies made by Allied aviation;
- expand the radio center to ensure continuity of operation;
- cooperate with Home Army units fighting in Warsaw to eliminate German units in the northwestern part of the city;
- organize standby units to ensure protection of the drop-off reception base.

At that time, the Kampinos Group already firmly controlled the central and eastern areas of the Kampinos Forest, encompassing the villages of Ławy, Łubiec, Roztoka, Kiścinne, Krogulec, Wędziszew, Brzozówka, Truskawka, Janówek, Pociecha, Zaborów Leśny, and Wiersze. The headquarters of the formation was located in the latter village. Polish patrols were also able to penetrate numerous neighboring towns previously unoccupied by the enemy. The area controlled by the Home Army soldiers was called the "Independent Republic of Kampinos".

== Arrival of the Kaminski Brigade in the Kampinos Forest ==
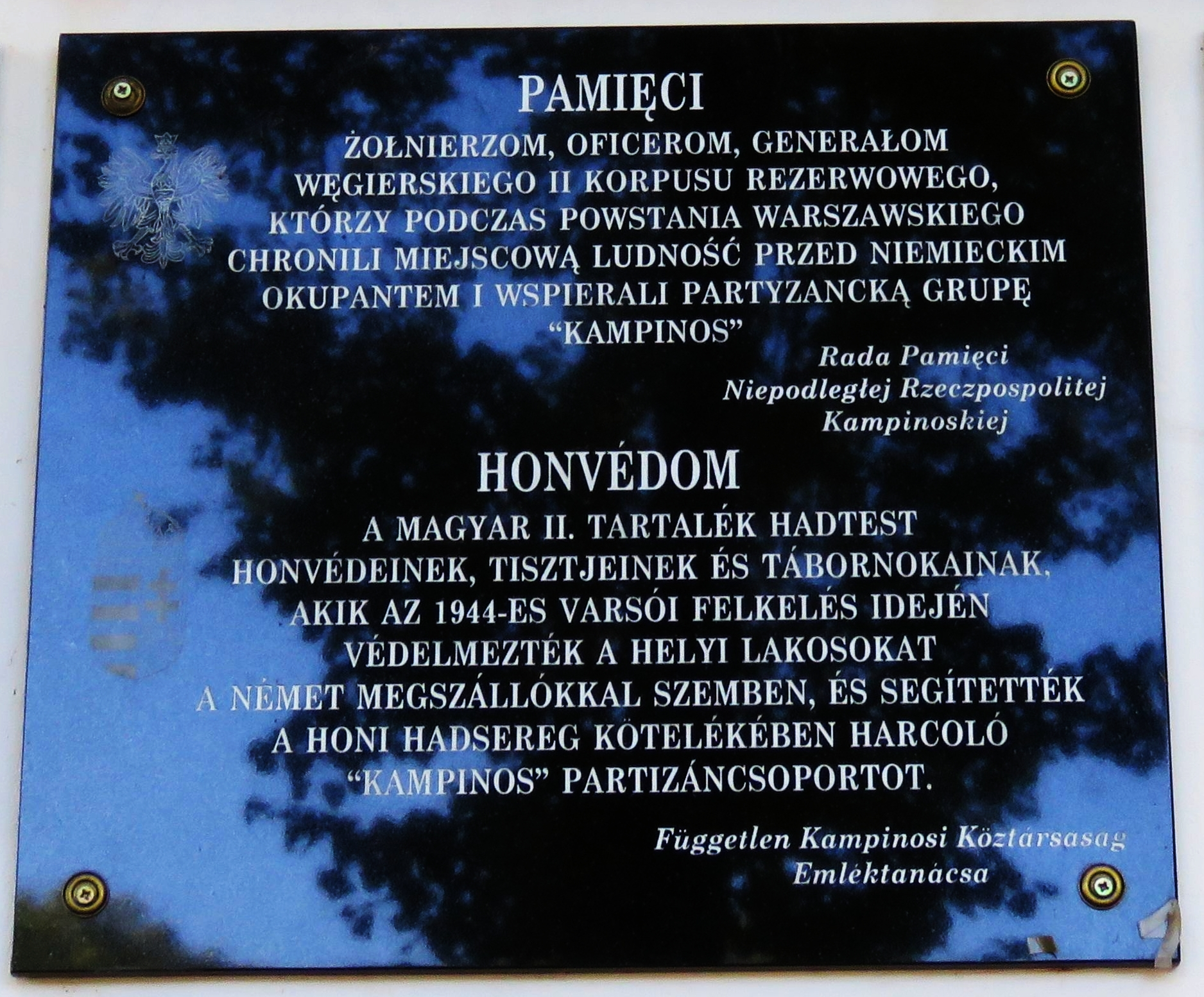
Plaque on the wall of the church in Wiersze, commemorating the benevolent attitude of Hungarian soldiers towards insurgents and civilians

The task of separating Warsaw from the Kampinos Forest was initially entrusted by the German command to their Hungarian allies, specifically to the 12th Reserve Division of the II Reserve Corps. However, the Germans quickly realized that the cordoned zone created by their allies remained largely fictional, as the Honvéd troops openly sympathized with the Poles. Although the Hungarian command rejected the Polish proposal to change sides, both parties entered into an informal "non-aggression pact". The Hungarians did not interfere with maintaining communication between the forest units and Żoliborz, even allowing on several occasions the passage of compact and well-armed Home Army units near their outposts. In this situation, at the end of August, the Germans withdrew the Hungarians from the vicinity of Warsaw, while simultaneously strengthening the cordon around the city. The Kampinos Group quickly felt these changes. On the night of August 26/27, or in the early morning of August 27, a unit of Jerzyk soldiers heading towards Żoliborz with a transport of weapons, ammunition, and food was warned by the chaplain of the hospital in Laski, Father Professor Stefan Wyszyński, codenamed Radwan III, that the road to Warsaw via Truskaw, Laski, and Izabelin was blocked by strong enemy positions. Moreover, the Germans were reportedly well-informed about the approaching Polish unit. When hastily dispatched patrols confirmed the validity of the warning, Lieutenant Jerzy withdrew his unit back to the forest. (Note: Over the next few nights, however, they managed to smuggle nearly two tons of food and several thousand rounds of ammunition into Warsaw (Borkiewicz (1969, p. 524)).)

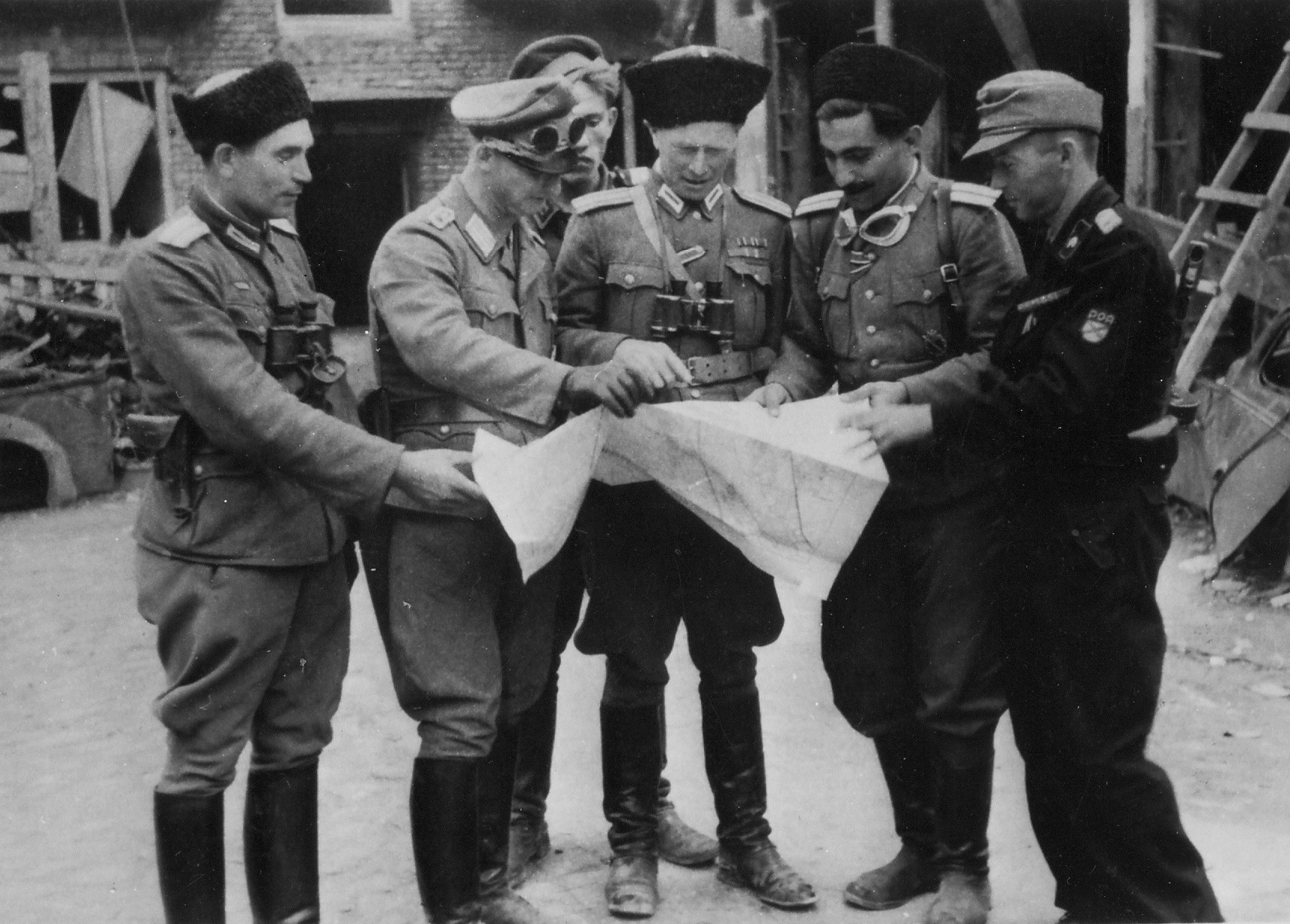
Command of a separate regiment from the Kaminski Brigade during the fighting in Warsaw

On August 27, in the afternoon, a detached regiment from the Kaminski Brigade arrived in Truskaw and Sieraków, numbering nearly 1,500 soldiers. Kaminski Brigade was a collaborationist formation, composed mainly of Russians and Belarusians. It was led by SS-Brigadeführer Bronislav Kaminski. From August 4, the Kaminski Brigade had been fighting in the Warsaw district of Ochota, and then in the southern part of the city center. However, the first clashes with the insurgents showed that Kaminski's unit had minimal combat value, and its soldiers were interested only in looting, alcohol, and women. During the battles in Ochota, the Kaminski Brigade soldiers committed many cruel crimes against the Polish civilian population. Their victims even included German women serving in Wehrmacht auxiliary formations. Furthermore, Kaminski, citing alleged authorizations obtained directly from Reichsführer-SS Heinrich Himmler, openly displayed insubordination to German generals. In this situation, the German command concluded that the further presence of Kaminski Brigade in Warsaw could bring more harm than benefit. Probably on August 19, Kaminski was relieved of command, and a week later he was summoned to Łódź, where he stood trial before a German drumhead court-martial, which sentenced him to death. The sentence was probably carried out on the night of August 28/29. The soldiers of the Kaminski Brigade were informed that Kaminski was killed by Polish partisans.

Meanwhile, on August 23, the Kaminski Brigade was transferred from the southern part of the city center to Muranów, from where it was redeployed to the Kampinos Forest after a few days, occupying the positions vacated by the Hungarian troops, who were not trusted by the Germans. Kaminski Brigade quickly established a solid line of defense stretching through Laski, Izabelin, and Borzęcin towards Leszno. Similar to what had happened earlier in Warsaw, the Kaminski Brigade brutally terrorized the Polish civilian population. For the inhabitants of Kampinos villages, robberies and rapes became a daily occurrence. Individuals who resisted or angered the soldiers were often murdered on the spot. The first skirmishes between the Kaminski Brigade and the soldiers of the Kampinos Group occurred on August 28. That day, in the morning, a patrol from the Jerzyk company went to Truskaw, where it engaged in a fight with a strong Kaminski Brigade unit. In the clash, three Home Army soldiers were killed or mortally wounded, while the enemy losses were estimated at two killed and eight wounded. Later, in the evening, Kaminski Brigade conducted a reconnaissance by combat in the vicinity of the hamlet of Pociecha. Home Army soldiers repelled the attack, killing or injuring several Kaminski Brigade soldiers.

== Fighting at Pociecha ==
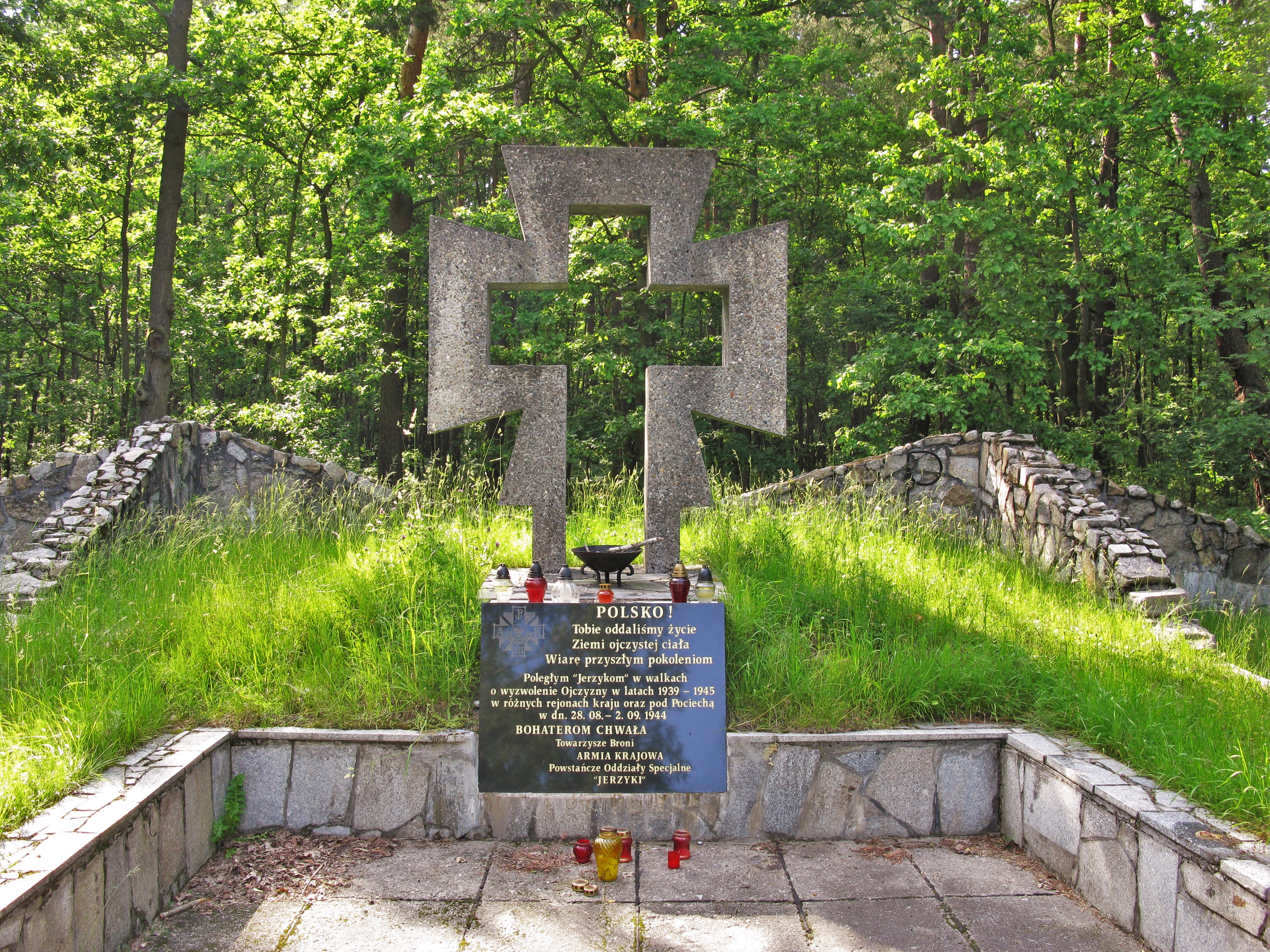
Monument in memory of soldiers from the Jerzyki company killed in the defense of Pociecha

Pociecha became the target of numerous enemy attacks in the following days. This was because the roads from Sieraków and Truskaw, through which the Germans and their collaborators could penetrate deep into the forest controlled by the partisans, converged there. The potential loss of the hamlet would also mean pushing the Home Army units away from strategically important roads like Warsaw–Modlin and Warsaw–Leszno, and ultimately isolating the "Republic of Kampinos" from insurgent Warsaw. Furthermore, the presence of a Polish outpost in Pociecha prevented the Germans from using a convenient forest trail leading from Warsaw through Palmiry to Kazuń and Modlin. (Note: The route provided a safe alternative to the Warsaw–Modlin highway, which was already threatened by Soviet air attacks at the time (Krzyczkowski (1962, pp. 314, 343)).)

The defense of Pociecha was initially entrusted to the Jerzyk company by the command of the Kampinos Group. However, on August 28, the infantry was reinforced with the 3rd squadron of the 27th Uhlan Regiment, commanded by Sub-Lieutenant Narcyz Kulikowski, codenamed Sum. This increased the number of defenders to about 200 soldiers. Over the next few days, significant Kaminski Brigade forces concentrated in the Pociecha area, estimated by the authors of the actions of Działania powstańcze VIII Rejonu to comprise two infantry battalions supported by two howitzers, two 75mm guns, and ten mortars.

On August 29, the Kaminski Brigade resumed attacks on Pociecha. (Note: Krzyczkowski (1962, pp. 343, 350) claimed that the Kaminski Brigade occupied Truskaw and Sieraków on August 29 and the morning of August 30, and they initiated offensive actions in the Pociecha area in the afternoon of August 30. The description of the battles at Pociecha in his memoirs also differs in many details from the accounts presented in other studies or memoir materials. (Krzyczkowski (1962, pp. 348–359); Borkiewicz (1969, pp. 525–526); Podgóreczny (2010, pp. 116–118, 120–130, 134–139)).) In the Jerzyk platoon defending the crucial position on the extensive dune near the hamlet, the artillery fire and the commander's injury caused a momentary panic. However, with the support of the Uhlans, the position was ultimately held, and the Kaminski Brigade were repelled, suffering heavy losses (Józef Krzyczkowski reported that these events took place on August 31). The enemy attacks on other sectors also failed.

From 30 to 31 August, the intensity of the fighting did not diminish. Polish positions were under heavy artillery and machine gun fire, and the Kaminski Brigade made periodic attempts to break through the Polish defense. German fighter planes also intervened twice. At noon on August 31, the Polish command replaced the Jerzyk company with Lieutenant Mazur's company from Major Korwin's Sochaczew Battalion. While taking over the frontline positions, the Sochaczew soldiers came under heavy artillery fire and left their defended position in disarray. However, a counterattack by the Jerzyk soldiers, who were brought back, allowed the situation to be regained, and by the end of the day, the soldiers of the Sochaczew Battalion were able to hold their positions independently (Józef Krzyczkowski reported that these events took place on September 2). In the evening of the same day, the 3rd squadron was also relieved, and their positions were taken over by the Uhlans from the 2nd squadron commanded by Senior Warrant Officer Józef Niedźwiecki, codenamed Lawina (Sum's squadron returned to the Pociecha area two days later).

From 1 to 2 September, the Polish positions in the Pociecha area were still under intense artillery fire from the enemy. Kaminski Brigade also continued its attempts to break through the Polish defense. Józef Krzyczkowski stated that for two days, the Russians launched somewhat hesitant attacks, each time being halted under the fire of Polish machine guns and mortars. The Kaminski Brigade command did not attempt to outflank the Polish positions but stubbornly sent its units into frontal attacks. Meanwhile, fatigue caused by constant enemy artillery fire was increasingly felt in the Polish units. Adam Borkiewicz, on the other hand, claimed that the Kaminski Brigade's offensive actions reached their peak on September 2 when, during hours-long fighting, Home Army soldiers repelled as many as seven enemy attacks.

According to Marian Podgóreczny's assessment, the six-day trench warfare in the Pociecha area was the longest partisan battle fought on Polish soil during the German occupation. Józef Krzyczkowski claimed that 16 Polish soldiers were killed and 23 were wounded in the defense of the village. The losses suffered by the Kaminski Brigade were estimated by him to be at least 30 killed and 40 wounded. Jerzy Koszada provided slightly different numbers. According to him, Polish units lost 21 killed and 35 wounded, while Kaminski Brigade's losses were 51 killed and 40 wounded.

== Night attack on Truskaw ==
=== Preparations ===
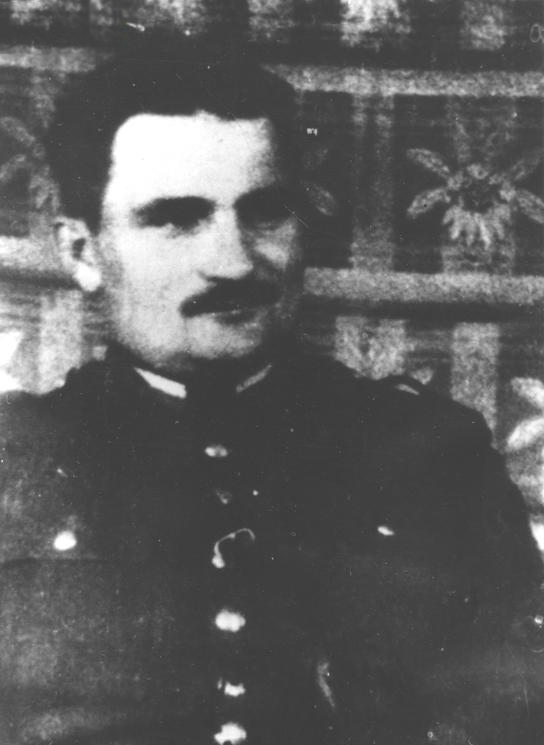
Adolf Pilch, codenamed Dolina

The course of the battles in the Pociecha area indicated that the Kampinos Group should not passively await further attacks by the Kaminski Brigade forces. It was necessary to anticipate the possibility of stronger enemy pressure, with the outcome of the next confrontation being unpredictable if the Germans reinforced the Kaminski Brigade with armored vehicles and additional artillery batteries. The Home Army intelligence reported the constant reinforcement of enemy forces in Truskaw and Sieraków, as well as the gathering of new units in Laski, Izabelin, and Hornówek. Meanwhile, the Kaminski Brigade artillery deployed in Truskaw and Sieraków was severely affecting the defenders of Pociecha. Polish soldiers had to spend hours entrenched under enemy fire, with casualties in killed and wounded every day. Polish outposts in Wiersze, Truskawka, Krogulec, and Kiscinne also fell within the range of enemy artillery. The Kampinos Group, lacking its own artillery, could not effectively respond to enemy fire. It was also impossible to neutralize the enemy artillery through forays into the open field, as the Kaminski Brigade batteries remained safely concealed behind their forward positions. The fact that the local population demanded a reaction from the Home Army soldiers to the crimes committed by the Kaminski Brigade was also not insignificant.

A frontal attack on well-fortified positions of a heavily armed enemy did not promise greater chances of success and also posed serious risks of casualties. In this situation, Lieutenant Dolina proposed to Major Okoń on September 1st to conduct a deep raid on the enemy's rear. The aim of this risky action was to break up the Kaminski Brigade battalion quartered in Truskaw. Despite initial hesitations, the group's commander agreed. It was decided that the raid on Truskaw would take place on the night of September 2nd to 3rd. Additionally, Okoń decided that on the same night, he would personally lead a similar raid on the Kaminski Brigade unit in neighboring Sieraków.

Due to the nature of the task, Dolina decided to carry out the raid with a small but well-armed unit consisting exclusively of carefully selected volunteers. Approximately 600 soldiers volunteered for the operation, of which the lieutenant selected 80 (Note: The number of 80 participants in the Truskaw raid was given by Adolf Pilch, as well as most sources describing the battles of the Kampinos Group. Borkiewicz (1969, p. 526) and Podlewski (1979, p. 240), on the other hand, claimed that the attacking unit numbered 120 soldiers.) (including 70 soldiers from frontline units and 10 from rear formations). All soldiers were armed with submachine guns and grenades, and several light machine guns and PIAT weapons were also taken. Okoń's unit was similarly armed, mainly composed of Uhlans from the 3rd squadron (its numbers were estimated by Adam Borkiewicz at about 100 soldiers). The plan envisaged that Dolina's unit would conduct a deep flanking maneuver around Truskaw from the west and south, followed by a surprise attack on the enemy's rear. The task was risky, as the soldiers had to pass through open fields unnoticed, avoiding enemy outposts along the way. A similar plan was devised to break up the Kaminski Brigade unit in Sieraków, although Okoń's task was somewhat easier as it could be circumvented more easily through the cover of the forest and overgrown meadows.

=== Course of the raid ===
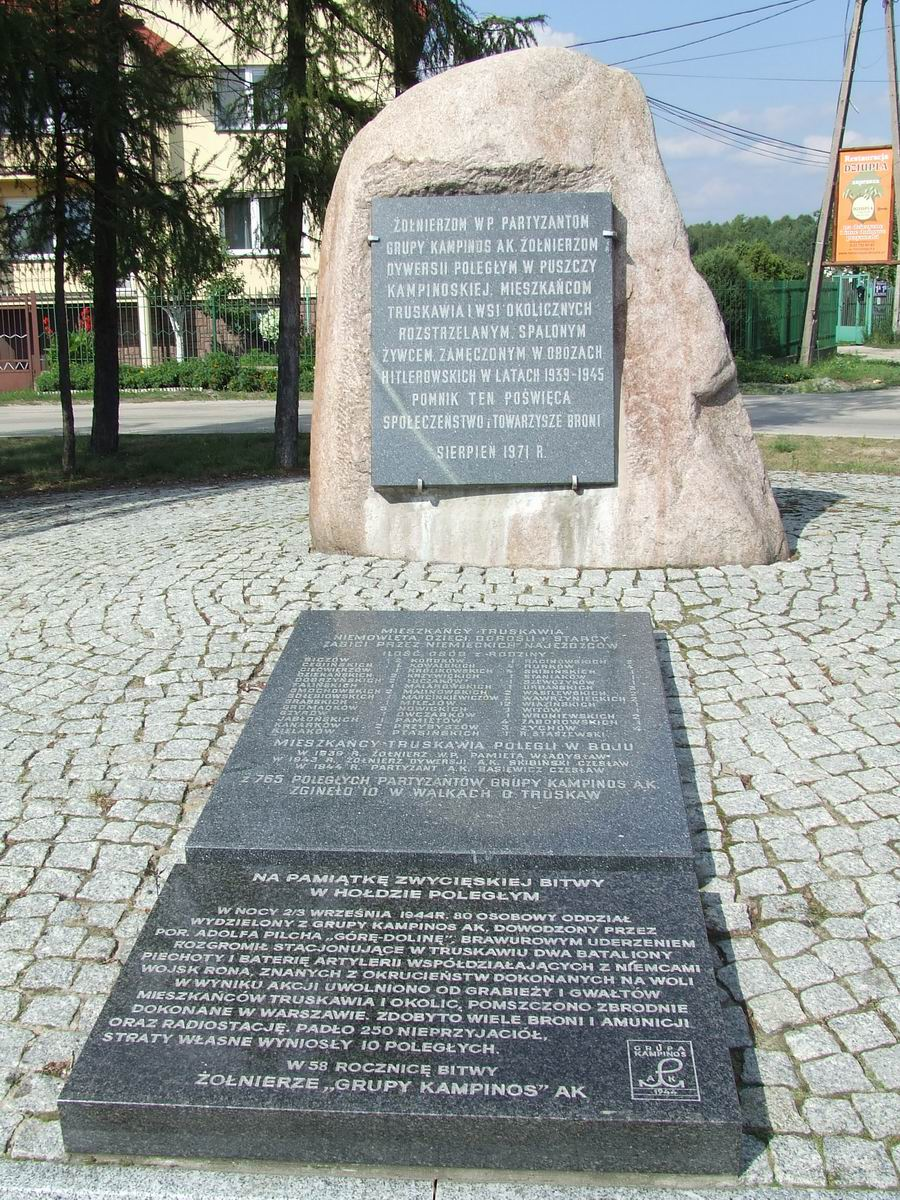
Monument in Truskaw, commemorating, among other things, the victorious raid of the Dolina unit

In the summer of 1944, the buildings of Truskaw were scattered over an area of nearly two kilometers and stretched from the Izabelin groves to the marshy meadows, which separated the village from the Kampinos Forest. A wide road ran through the village. Near the center of Truskaw, roads leading to Pociecha and Mariew converged, creating the equivalent of a large square. It was precisely at this location that the enemy camp was located, while the artillery positions lay a little further northeast. The enemy forces quartered in Truskaw were estimated to consist of an infantry battalion and an artillery battery – together about 500 soldiers. Valuable information about the enemy's strength and the location of their positions was provided to Dolina by the scout Józef Zych, codenamed Sosna, who infiltrated the village before the strike force set out on the mission.

The departure from Wiersze took place on September 2 at 7:00 PM. Not wanting to unnecessarily fatigue the soldiers before the battle, Dolina decided that the unit would be transported to the starting positions by wagons. The journey through sandy forest paths took about two hours. Upon reaching the forward positions in Zaborowo Leśne, the soldiers left the wagons and continued on foot. Dolina informed Lieutenant Jerzy and Sergeant Narcyz about the planned action, instructing them to wait ready and come to the aid of the strike force if necessary. Fearing that the soldiers might get lost in the darkness, or worse, stumble upon enemy outposts by chance, Dolina ordered them to march in pairs in close formation. However, that night the moon was bright, and only the lingering fog covered the unit's march. The soldiers, marching along the edge of the forest, reached the open space, then traversed a canal running through the fields to enter the forest called Dębina. Along the way, they managed to stealthily bypass enemy outposts. After a brief rest in Dębina, the unit unnoticedly made its way to the sandy dunes stretching along the Szałasy grove, where Dolina ordered another short rest. Finally, after nearly two and a half hours of approach, the Polish soldiers reached the southeastern outskirts of Truskaw.

Dolina then divided his unit into three groups. On the left flank was a team led by Lieutenant Lech Zabierek, codenamed Wulkan. In the center, a team led by Lieutenant Aleksander Wolski, codenamed Jastrząb, moved, responsible for securing the rear. The right flank was occupied by a detachment led by Lieutenant Tadeusz Gaworski, codenamed Lawa, (Note: Koźniewski & Nowakowski (2000, pp. 77, 79) reported that almost the entire personnel of Lieutenant Lawa's Aviation Company took part in the Truskaw expedition. Soldiers of this unit were to make up almost half of the attacking unit.) accompanied by Dolina himself. It was decided that the password for the night battle would be the call sobota! (English: Saturday!). The Polish soldiers entered Truskaw at around midnight. The village was deserted as most of the residents had fled earlier for fear of the Kaminski Brigade. However, in one of the farms, the soldiers found an old peasant who informed them that the enemy unit was quartered in the farm buildings at the other end of the village, closest to the Kampinos Forest. The old man also warned that another Kaminski Brigade battalion had arrived in the village that night, equipped with at least several cannons. This fact meant that the already apparent numerical disparity of forces had increased even more. (Note: It was estimated that after the arrival of another battalion, the number of the Kaminski Brigade soldiers staying in Truskaw could have risen to as many as a thousand (Pilch (2013, p. 226); Koszada (2007, p. 55); Łaszkiewicz (2013, p. 10)).) After a brief consideration, Dolina decided, however, to attack according to the plan, hoping that the element of surprise would neutralize the enemy's numerical advantage.

It was probably around 1:00 AM when Dolina's soldiers began their attack. The surprise to the enemy was complete. Polish soldiers later described the course of the battle as a "slaughter". Many Kaminski Brigade soldiers were killed in their sleep, while the remaining, completely surprised and often stunned by alcohol, were unable to mount organized resistance against the Poles. In this action, Home Army soldiers did not take prisoners. Soon, a significant part of the village was set on fire. Many Kaminski Brigade soldiers burned in the ignited barns. Polish soldiers only briefly ceased fire to allow women held captive by the Kaminski Brigade to escape from the burning buildings. In the darkness of the night, the fighting took place at close quarters, and only the agreed password sobota allowed the Polish soldiers to distinguish friends from foes. Some of the enemy soldiers, having recovered from the initial surprise, opened fire with grenades and machine guns, but amidst the chaos, this fire struck their comrades more than the Polish partisans. The few remaining enemy resistance nests were eliminated by Dolina's soldiers using grenades or PIATs. Among other things, grenades were used to clear out the command post of the Kaminski Brigade battalion, which had taken refuge in the basement of one of the houses. Soon, the surviving Russians began a panicked retreat. Those fleeing towards the village of Ławy were hunted down by Wulkan's soldiers, while Lawa's detachment eliminated the enemies trying to occupy backup positions on the eastern outskirts of the village. Incidents occurred where wounded Kaminski Brigade soldiers were finished off by local peasants, seeking revenge for earlier murders, rapes, and looting.

The first to reach the enemy battery was a team led by Sergeant Aleksander Bibik, codenamed Zaręba, from Lieutenant Jastrząb's group. The gun crew was quickly wiped out. Polish soldiers did not have means of transportation to evacuate the captured guns, so most of them were rendered unusable. The guns were destroyed by throwing grenades into the barrels or placing artillery shells wrapped in bundles of straw under their carriages, which were then set on fire. Dozens of wagons from the enemy camp also went up in flames. The fight was already dying down when the crates of ammunition on the wagons began to explode, momentarily mistaken for the sound of German reinforcements for the Kaminski Brigade. Around 4:00 AM, Dolina's unit began to withdraw towards Zaborów Leśny. The enemy units stationed in nearby villages remained passive. Sergeant Zaręba managed to take out one captured gun from the burning Truskaw, while Lawa's soldiers took a wagon with artillery ammunition with them.

However, the raid on Sieraków carried out on the same night turned out to be unsuccessful. When Major Okoń's unit reached the village, it turned out that the enemy had left it the day before. Moreover, the Kaminski Brigade unit that left Sieraków was the same unit that was quartered in Truskaw that night and was defeated there by Dolina's soldiers. Józef Krzyczkowski believed that the failure of the raid on Sieraków was due to neglecting earlier reconnaissance of the enemy's positions. Major Okoń's excessive bravado was also criticized, as contrary to Sergeant Narcyz's suggestions, he struck Sieraków frontally, which in case of encountering enemy resistance could have ended in failure and heavy losses.

== Aftermath ==
The risky raid on Truskaw was crowned with complete success. The small unit led by Dolina managed to completely break two strong Kaminski Brigade subunits and eliminate the artillery position that had been troubling the defenders of Pociecha. The losses suffered by the Kaminski Brigade that night can only be estimated approximately. Józef Krzyczkowski and Adolf Pilch, relying on information obtained from the local population, estimated that around 250 Kaminski Brigade soldiers were killed during the night battle, with another 100 wounded. Tadeusz Łaszkiewicz, based on information from the partisan cavalry reconnaissance, estimated the enemy's losses at around 130 killed. Adam Borkiewicz and Tomasz Zatwarnicki, on the other hand, assessed that the Kaminski Brigade lost 91 killed in this engagement. Dolina's soldiers captured a 75 mm caliber gun with an ammunition wagon, two heavy mortars, 1 medium machine gun, 13 light machine guns, several dozen submachine guns, a field radio station with batteries, and large quantities of ammunition and grenades. (Note: Other sources state that during the raid on Truskaw, the following items were captured: a 75mm caliber gun along with 26 shells, 2 heavy mortars with two crates of ammunition, 2 medium machine gun, 23 light machine guns, 16 submachine guns, 48 rifles with 10,000 rounds of ammunition, a field radio station with batteries, 11 horses, and 6 carts, including four with food and uniforms (Borkiewicz (1969, p. 526); Powstanie Warszawskie (2007, p. 1091)).) Numerous watches and valuables looted previously in Warsaw were found near the bodies of the fallen Kaminski Brigade soldiers. Additionally, the Poles destroyed several to a dozen artillery pieces (including one 105 mm caliber), as well as 60 rifles and nearly 30 ammunition wagons.

Polish losses amounted to 10 killed and 10 wounded. Among the fallen were: Lieutenant Marcin Taszkan codenamed Tur, Corporal Jan Szostak codenamed Fab, Corporal Jan Łukaszewicz codenamed Januszek, Senior Rifleman Jan Kazimierz Jarkowski codenamed Sewer, Senior Lancer Karol Piesiewicz, Senior Rifleman Kazimierz Szczerbiński, Rifleman Jerzy Woźniak codenamed Brązowy, and Rifleman Jerzy Zawadzki codenamed Kri. (Note: In older sources, one can find slightly different data on the personalities and military ranks of the soldiers killed (Pilch (2013, p. 230); Krzyczkowski (1962, pp. 373–374)).)

One of the Kaminski Brigade soldiers killed in Truskaw was Rifleman Ivan Ivanovich Vaschenko from the village of Kociewicze in the Vitebsk Region. His personal diary was found next to his body, which was later translated into Polish on Captain Szymon's orders. After the war, Ivan Vaschenko's diary became a valuable source of information for Polish historians about the Kaminski Brigade and its participation in the suppression of the Warsaw Uprising.

The Polish command decided to convince the enemy that the Kampinos Group had embarked on large-scale offensive actions. Therefore, on the night of September 3/4, another raid was carried out – this time aimed at the village of Marianów near Leszno, where a strong garrison consisting of Germans and Kaminski Brigade troops was quartered. The combined unit under the command of Captain Zdzisław Nurkiewicz codenamed Nieczaj and Lieutenant Zygmunt Koc codenamed Dąbrowa, consisting of 80 lancers from the 2nd and 4th squadrons, made a deep flanking maneuver around the enemy positions, then struck Marianów from the south. As a result of the half-hour battle, the enemy unit was completely shattered, losing between 60 and 100 killed. Between 22 and 24 Kaminski Brigade soldiers were captured. They were executed when objects and valuables looted in Warsaw were found in their possession. The lancers captured 2 light machine guns, 7 submachine guns, several horses with saddles, and dozens of rifles. Polish losses were limited to one killed and five wounded.

On September 4, Kaminski Brigade subunits withdrew to the Laski–Izabelin–Hornówek–Lipków line, setting fire to half of Truskaw's buildings and almost the entire Sieraków beforehand. The Kaminski Brigade soldiers did not dare to conduct any more offensive actions against the Kampinos Group, limiting themselves to terrorizing the residents of the surrounding villages. On September 15, the remnants of the regiment were loaded onto transport in Błonie and sent to the Racibórz area, where the rest of the Kaminski Brigade forces were stationed. The entire brigade was later incorporated into the Russian 29th SS Grenadier Division, being organized in Germany.

== Commemoration ==
In Truskaw, at the crossroads of roads leading from Izabelin and Borzęcin to Pociecha, a commemorative rock and plaque were unveiled in August 1971, dedicated to the soldiers of the Polish Army and the Home Army, as well as the residents of Truskaw and the surrounding villages who fell and were murdered during World War II. In September 2002, another plaque commemorating the victorious raid of the Dolina unit was unveiled at the monument.

In Pociecha, on a small hill surrounded by a wall, there is also a monument commemorating the soldiers of the Jerzyki company who fell in defense of the village from August 28 to September 2, 1944. The monument consists of a stylized cross and a plaque set at an angle.

== Bibliography ==
- Bartelski, Lesław Marian (2002). "Obroża". Przewodnik historyczny po miejscach walk i pamięci (in Polish). Warsaw: Foundation "Wystawa Warszawa Walczy 1939–1945" and "Askon". ISBN 83-87545-48-1.
- Borkiewicz, Adam (1969). Powstanie warszawskie. Zarys działań natury wojskowej (in Polish). Warsaw: Pax.
- Kirchmayer, Jerzy (1984). Powstanie Warszawskie (in Polish). Warsaw: Książka i Wiedza. ISBN 83-05-11-080-X.
- Koszada, Jerzy (2007). "Grupa Kampinos". Partyzanckie zgrupowanie Armii Krajowej walczące w Powstaniu Warszawskim (in Polish). Warsaw: ZP GRUPA Sp. z o.o. ISBN 978-83-925916-6-5.
- Koźniewski, Jan; Nowakowski, Marek Tadeusz (2000). Lawiacy. Historia kompanii lotniczej AK (in Polish). Warsaw: Askon. ISBN 83-87545-30-9.
- Krzyczkowski, Józef (1962). Konspiracja i powstanie w Kampinosie (in Polish). Warsaw: Ludowa Spółdzielnia Wydawnicza.
- Łaszkiewicz, Tomasz (2013). Opowieść kampinoska 1944 (in Polish). Warsaw: Egros. ISBN 978-83-63427-01-6.
- Nowak, Szymon (2011). Puszcza Kampinoska – Jaktorów 1944 (in Polish). Warsaw: Bellona. ISBN 9788311121416.
- Pilch, Adolf (2013). Partyzanci trzech puszcz. Kraków: Oficyna Wydawnicza Mireki. ISBN 978-83-89533-92-0.
- Podgóreczny, Marian (2010). Doliniacy. Niepodległa Rzeczpospolita Kampinoska (in Polish). Vol. II. Warsaw: BMT ERIDIA. ISBN 978-83-930539-3-3.
- Podlewski, Stanisław (1979). Rapsodia żoliborska (in Polish). Warsaw: Pax. ISBN 83-211-0009-0.
- Sawicki, Tadeusz (2010). Rozkaz zdławić powstanie. Niemcy i ich sojusznicy w walce z powstaniem warszawskim (in Polish). Warsaw: Bellona. ISBN 978-83-11-11892-8.
- Powstanie Warszawskie 1944 w dokumentach z archiwów służb specjalnych (in Polish). Warsaw – Moscow: Instytut Pamięci Narodowej. 2007. ISBN 978-83-60464-32-8.
