= Defense of Pociecha =

Defensive battles during the Warsaw Uprising of 1944

- Part of the Warsaw Uprising
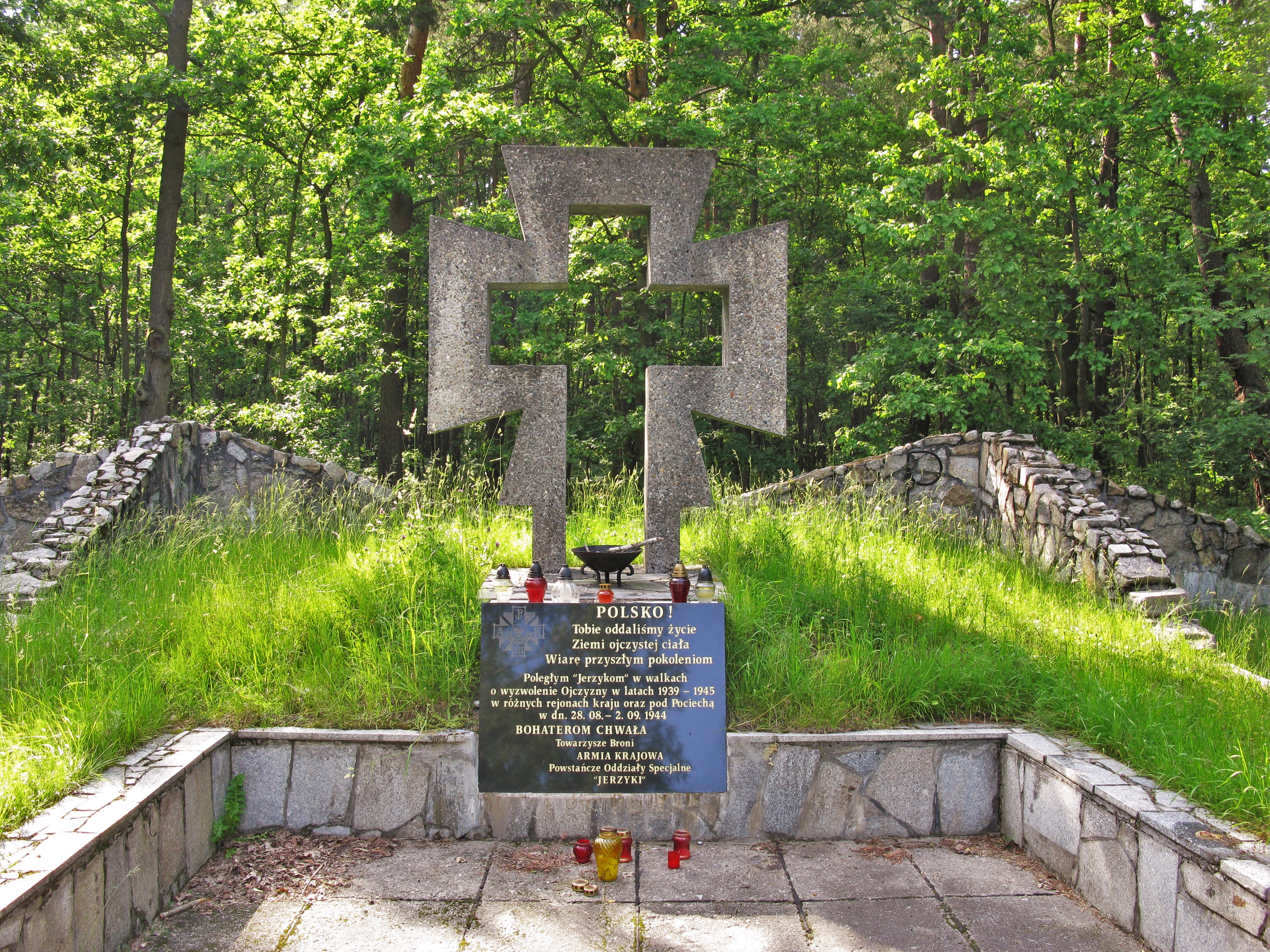
- Monument in honor of the soldiers of the Jerzyki special units who fell defending Pociecha
Date	28 August–27 September 1944
Location	Pociecha
Result	Polish victory

Belligerents
Polish Underground State	Nazi Germany

Commanders and leaders
Jerzy Strzałkowski; Władysław Starzyk; Narcyz Kulikowski	unknown

Strength
about 200 soldiers	about 100 soldiers artillery air support

Casualties and losses
16–21 killed 23–35 wounded	30–51 killed 40 wounded

Defense of Pociecha refers to defensive battles fought by soldiers of the Kampinos Group of the Home Army during the Warsaw Uprising of 1944 in the area of the hamlet Pociecha, located on the southeastern edge of the Kampinos Forest.

Pociecha was one of the most critical defensive positions of the Kampinos Group, as it prevented the Germans from using convenient forest trails and blocked access to the interior of the forest. Between late August and early September 1944, Home Army soldiers engaged in a six-day positional battle in this region, successfully repelling numerous attacks by the collaborationist Russian People's Liberation Army. In mid-September, the Germans made another attempt to capture Pociecha, but Polish soldiers once again repelled all assaults. The hamlet fell into German hands only in the final days of September.

According to Marian Podgóreczny, the battles fought in defense of Pociecha were the longest partisan engagement on Polish soil during the German occupation.

== 'Independent Republic of Kampinos' ==
Following the outbreak of the Warsaw Uprising, armed operations extended to the Kampinos Forest, where units of the VIII District Łęgi of the Warsaw County Subdistrict of the Warsaw District of the Home Army joined the fight. On the eve of the uprising, the VIII District could field two infantry battalions comprising five front-line companies, though only between 350 and 400 soldiers were armed. Fortunately for the Polish side, the balance of forces in the Kampinos Forest shifted dramatically in late July 1944 when the Stowbtsy-Naliboki Group, arriving from the Naliboki forest in Kresy, encamped in Dziekanów Polski. This group numbered 861 well-armed soldiers and was led by Lieutenant Adolf Pilch, codenamed Góra or Dolina – a Silent Unseen and seasoned partisan who had been fighting the Germans and Soviet partisans since autumn 1943. After the uprising began, small Home Army units from various Warsaw districts, retreating after the failure of initial Polish assaults at "W" Hour, also arrived in the forest. Over time, additional units from neighboring districts and circuits of the Warsaw District, as well as from the Western Subdistrict of the Warsaw Area of the Home Army, reached the area.

In mid-August, these incoming units formed the partisan formation known as the Kampinos Group. At its peak, it comprised approximately 2,700 soldiers and 700 horses. By late August, the Kampinos Group had gained uncontested control over the central and eastern parts of the Kampinos Forest, encompassing the villages of Ławy, Łubiec, Roztoka, Kiścinne, Krogulec, Wędziszew, Brzozówka, Truskawka, Janówek, Pociecha, Zaborów Leśny, and Wiersze. Polish patrols were also able to probe numerous adjacent localities not yet occupied by the enemy. The area controlled by Home Army soldiers became known as the "Independent Republic of Kampinos". Its unofficial capital was Wiersze, where the Kampinos Group's headquarters was located.

The German command initially tasked the Hungarian 12th Reserve Division of the II Reserve Corps with isolating Warsaw from the "Independent Republic of Kampinos". However, the Germans soon realized that the cordon established by their allies was largely ineffective, as the Hungarian soldiers openly sympathized with the Poles. While Hungarian commanders rejected a Polish proposal to switch sides, both parties entered into an informal "non-aggression pact". The Hungarians did not hinder communication between the forest units and the insurgent Żoliborz district, even allowing well-armed Home Army units to pass near their positions on several occasions. As a result, by late August, the Germans were forced to withdraw the Hungarians from the Warsaw area and began reinforcing the cordon around the city.

== Defense of Pociecha from 28 August to 2 September ==
=== Russian People's Liberation Army attacks ===
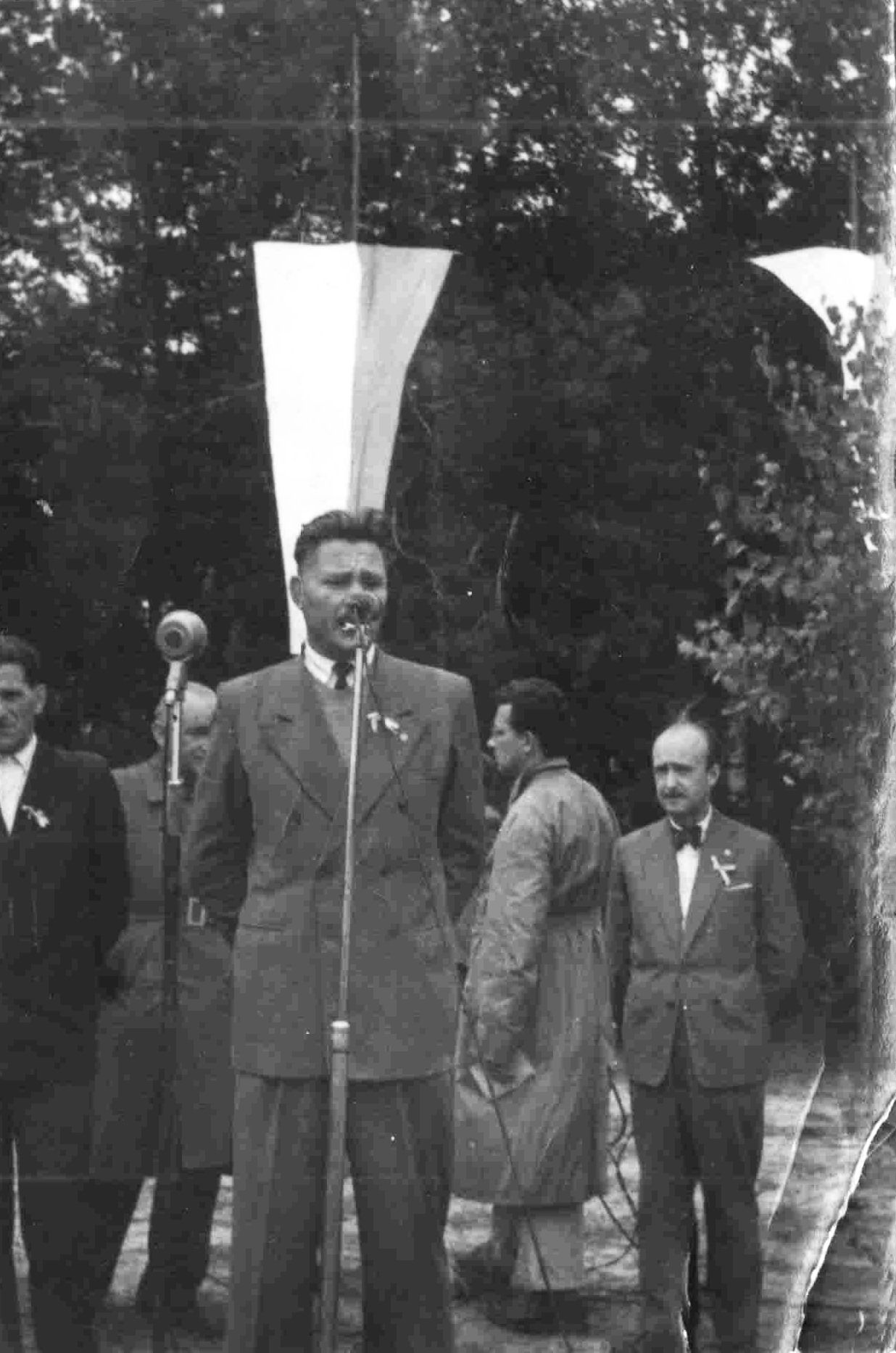
Commander of the Jerzyki Company, Lieutenant Jerzy Strzałkowski, during anniversary commemorations in Pociecha, 1957

On 27 August, subunits of a detached regiment from the Russian People's Liberation Army, numbering nearly 1,500 soldiers, occupied the areas around Truskaw and Sieraków. Russian People's Liberation Army was a collaborationist formation composed mainly of Russians and Belarusians. Its subunits quickly formed a tight cordon stretching through Laski, Izabelin, and Borzęcin toward Leszno. As previously seen in Warsaw, Russian People's Liberation Army soldiers brutally terrorized the Polish civilian population. For the residents of Kampinos villages, looting and rapes became daily occurrences. Those who resisted or provoked the soldiers were often killed on the spot.

The first skirmishes between Russian People's Liberation Army and Kampinos Group soldiers occurred on 28 August. That morning, a patrol from the Jerzyki Company, led by Cadet Officer Zbigniew Stok, codenamed Żarski, ventured into Truskaw and engaged a strong Russian People's Liberation Army detachment. The Polish soldiers were forced to retreat, and the pursuing Russians were halted only by fire from the Jerzyki's forward outposts. Three Home Army soldiers were killed or mortally wounded in the clash. Russian People's Liberation Army losses were estimated at two killed and eight wounded.

Soon, the Polish outpost at the hamlet of Pociecha, near Truskaw, became the target of numerous Russian attacks. This was a key defensive position for the Kampinos Group, as it controlled the convergence of roads from Sieraków and Truskaw, which the Germans and their collaborators could use to penetrate the partisan-controlled forest interior. Losing the hamlet would push Home Army units away from the strategically vital Warsaw–Modlin and Warsaw–Leszno highways, effectively isolating the "Kampinos Republic" from insurgent Warsaw. Moreover, the Polish outpost at Pociecha prevented the Germans from using a convenient forest trail running from Warsaw through Palmiry to Kazuń and Modlin, forcing them to rely solely on the Warsaw–Modlin highway, which was already under threat from Soviet air attacks by this time. By 1 September, significant Russian People's Liberation Army forces had concentrated around Pociecha, estimated by the authors of Działania powstańcze VIII Rejonu (Insurgent Operations of the VIII District) at two infantry battalions supported by two howitzers, two 75 mm guns, and ten mortars. (Note: Borkiewicz (1969, p. 525) estimated the strength of the Russian People's Liberation Army at four infantry companies and two cavalry squadrons. They were also reported to have two howitzers, six light cannons, and six mortars at their disposal.)

The Kampinos Group command initially entrusted the defense of Pociecha to the Jerzyki Company. Soon, however, the infantry was reinforced by a squadron from the 27th Uhlan Regiment, increasing the number of defenders to about 200 soldiers. Józef Krzyczkowski, followed by Jerzy Koszada, stated that the 2nd Squadron, under Senior Warrant Officer Józef Niedźwiedzki, codenamed Lawina, was dispatched to the hamlet. However, Marian Podgóreczny, codenamed Żbik – chronicler of the Stowbtsy-Naliboki Group and a participant in the Pociecha battles – firmly maintained that on the late afternoon of 28 August, the Jerzyki Company was reinforced by his own 3rd Squadron, led by Warrant Officer Cadet Narcyz Kulikowski, codenamed Sum. The Polish units were deployed as follows:

- The center of the Polish defense was a large sand dune, partially covered with old-growth forest and sloping southward toward Truskaw. The northern edge of this elevation was just a few dozen meters from Pociecha's western buildings. Outposts on the dune, later dubbed "Westerplatte", were held by a Jerzyki platoon under 2nd Lieutenant Zdzisław Pajewski, codenamed Zych, alongside part of the II Uhlan platoon led by Corporal Bruno Dawidowski, codenamed Bronek.
- The main Jerzyki forces occupied a 500-meter forest edge on the right wing of the Polish defense, stretching from the dune to Hill 95.2. This hill marked the westernmost point of the Polish line. Slightly deeper in the forest was the command post of the Jerzyki commander, Lieutenant Jerzy Strzałkowski, codenamed Jerzy.
- The remaining subunits of the 3rd Squadron took positions on the left wing, along the forest edge northwest of Pociecha's buildings. The uhlans' task was to secure forest trails leading to Sadowa and Palmiry. Warrant Officer Sum established his post near a gamekeeper's lodge.

Fighting at Pociecha began on 28 August. (Note: Krzyczkowski (1962, pp. 343, 350) claimed that the Russian People's Liberation Army occupied Truskaw and Sieraków on 29 August and on the morning of 30 August, and that they initiated offensive actions in the Pociecha area in the afternoon of 30 August. The account of the battles near Pociecha in his memoirs also differs in many details from those presented in other studies or memoir materials (Borkiewicz (1969, pp. 525–526); Podgóreczny (2010, pp. 116–118, 120–130, 134–139)).) That evening, Russian People's Liberation Army conducted a reconnaissance by fire. According to Adam Borkiewicz, the assault involved an infantry company reinforced by a reconnaissance platoon and supported by artillery. Marian Podgóreczny estimated the Russian force at 100–200 soldiers. Polish partisans repelled the attack, killing or wounding several Russian People's Liberation Army soldiers.

On 29 August, Russian People's Liberation Army resumed offensive actions. From early morning, Polish positions were under heavy machine-gun fire, and shortly before noon, enemy artillery joined the battle. Under this cover, Russian infantry soon advanced. In the Jerzyki platoon defending the dune outpost, artillery fire and the wounding of the commander caused momentary panic. Corporal Marian Podgóreczny, codenamed Żbik, prevented a collapse by threatening the fleeing infantry with his weapon. With support from two reserve cavalry sections, the position was held, and Russian People's Liberation Army was repelled with heavy losses (Józef Krzyczkowski dated these events to 31 August). The Russians also struck the right wing but were stopped by Lieutenant Jerzy's infantry.

On 30–31 August, the intensity of combat remained high. Polish positions endured heavy artillery and machine-gun fire, with Russian People's Liberation Army periodically attempting to breach the defenses. Marian Podgóreczny recalled that the Russian attacks primarily targeted the "Westerplatte" outpost and the Jerzyki positions on the right wing. Józef Krzyczkowski noted that on 30 August, a Russian People's Liberation Army company unsuccessfully tried to outflank the Polish left wing. That day, German fighters also mistakenly strafed a Russian skirmish line. At noon on 31 August, Polish command replaced the Jerzyki with a company under 2nd Lieutenant Mazur from Major Korwin's Sochaczew Battalion. During the handover, the Sochaczew troops came under heavy artillery fire and abandoned the position in disarray. A counterattack by the recalled Jerzyki stabilized the situation, and by day's end, the Sochaczew Battalion held the line independently (Józef Krzyczkowski dated these events to 2 September). That evening, the 3rd Squadron was relieved, with its positions taken over by the 2nd Squadron under Senior Warrant Officer Józef Niedźwiedzki, codenamed Lawina. (Note: Koszada (2007, p. 53) claimed that on 1 September, the cavalrymen from the 2nd squadron, who had supposedly been fighting at Pociecha up until that point, were relieved by the 3rd squadron under the command of Warrant Officer Sum.) The dune outpost was manned by the I Platoon under Warrant Officer Jan Lewicki, codenamed Łotysz, while the other two uhlan platoons held the left wing.

On 1–2 September, Polish positions around Pociecha remained under intense enemy artillery fire. Russian People's Liberation Army continued its attempts to break through. Józef Krzyczkowski reported that over two days, the Russians launched half-hearted assaults, each faltering under Polish machine-gun and mortar fire. Russian People's Liberation Army command refrained from flanking maneuvers, stubbornly committing to frontal attacks, while Polish troops grew increasingly exhausted from constant artillery bombardment. Adam Borkiewicz, however, claimed that Russian People's Liberation Army's offensive peaked on 2 September, with Home Army soldiers repelling seven enemy attacks during hours of combat. (Note: Borkiewicz (1969, p. 526) stated that during the battles fought on 2 September, the losses of the defenders of Pociecha amounted to 6 killed and 9 wounded. The Russian People's Liberation Army was reported to have lost 11 killed and 19 wounded.)

On the evening of 2 September, the 3rd Squadron under Warrant Officer Sum reoccupied Pociecha positions, relieving Lawina's uhlans. That same evening, a makeshift Kampinos Group "artillery" unit under 2nd Lieutenant Leszczyc briefly supported the defenders, firing several dozen mortar and grenade launcher rounds at enemy positions.

=== Outcome ===
2 September marked the final day of Russian People's Liberation Army's attacks on Pociecha. Polish sources provide varying estimates of losses. Józef Krzyczkowski estimated that 16 Polish soldiers died and 23 were wounded defending Pociecha. He specified that the Jerzyki and cavalry lost 10 killed and 21 wounded, while the Sochaczew Battalion suffered a few casualties. Jerzy Koszada estimated Polish losses at 21 killed and 35 wounded.

Krzyczkowski assessed Russian People's Liberation Army's losses at a minimum of 30 killed and 40 wounded. Jerzy Koszada estimated them at 51 killed and 40 wounded.

Marian Podgóreczny considered the six-day positional battle at Pociecha the longest partisan engagement fought on Polish soil during the German occupation.

=== Raids on Truskaw and Marianów ===
Polish command recognized that the Kampinos Group could not limit itself to passive defense. A stronger enemy push was a real threat, and the outcome could be unpredictable if the Germans reinforced Russian People's Liberation Army with armored units and additional artillery. Home Army intelligence reported the steady buildup of enemy forces in Truskaw and Sieraków, as well as the assembly of new units in Laski, Izabelin, and Hornówek. Russian People's Liberation Army artillery in Truskaw and Sieraków was taking a toll on Pociecha's defenders, who spent hours in trenches under fire, suffering daily casualties. Additionally, local civilians demanded Home Army action against Russian People's Liberation Army atrocities.

On the night of 2–3 September, Lieutenant Adolf Pilch, codenamed Dolina, commander of the Palmiry-Młociny Regiment, led an 80-man assault unit on Russian People's Liberation Army quarters in Truskaw. After a deep flanking maneuver, they struck from the southeast, catching the Russians off guard. At the cost of 10 killed and 10 wounded, Dolina's small force routed two Russian People's Liberation Army battalions, capturing significant amounts of weapons and ammunition (including a 75 mm gun). Between 91 and 250 Russian People's Liberation Army soldiers were killed, and several to a dozen guns and nearly 30 ammunition wagons were destroyed. That same night, Kampinos Group commander Major Alfons Kotowski, codenamed Okoń, personally led a similar raid on nearby Sieraków, but the assault struck empty air as the Russians had abandoned the village the previous day.

To convince the enemy that the Kampinos Group had launched a large-scale offensive, a raid was conducted on the night of 3–4 September on Marianów, near Leszno, where a strong garrison of Germans and Russian People's Liberation Army troops was stationed. A combined unit under Captain Zdzisław Nurkiewicz, codenamed Nieczaj, and 2nd Lieutenant Zygmunt Koc, codenamed Dąbrowa, consisting of 80 uhlans from the 2nd and 4th Squadrons, outflanked the enemy and attacked from the south. In under 30 minutes, the enemy was crushed. The Polish cavalry killed 60–100 Russian People's Liberation Army soldiers, captured some weapons, and took 22–24 prisoners (later executed after looted Warsaw valuables were found on them). Polish losses were one killed and five wounded.

On 4 September, Russian People's Liberation Army subunits retreated to the Laski–Izabelin–Hornówek–Lipków line, after burning half of Truskaw and nearly all of Sieraków. Russian People's Liberation Army ceased offensive actions against the Kampinos Group, limiting itself to terrorizing local villagers. On 15 September, the regiment's remnants were loaded onto transports in Błonie and sent to the Racibórz area, where the rest of Russian People's Liberation Army was stationed. The brigade was later incorporated into the forming 29th Waffen Grenadier Division of the SS in Germany.

== Defensive actions in mid-September ==
Victories at Truskaw and Marianów temporarily eased enemy pressure on Pociecha. However, by 12 September, the Germans reoccupied Truskaw and Sieraków. Fighting soon resumed around Pociecha, though less intensely than from late August to early September. The Germans harassed the defenders with artillery and mortar fire, while small infantry subunits or armored vehicle groups periodically attempted to dislodge the Poles. Unlike before, attacks were not limited to Truskaw and Sieraków; the Germans also probed Polish positions from Palmiry.

The Sochaczew Battalion under Major Korwin was responsible for Pociecha's defense at this time. Every three days, one of its companies rotated in, relieved by another. The Kampinos Group command reinforced them with a squadron from the 27th Uhlan Regiment, rotated every 24 hours. Polish sappers laid anti-tank and anti-personnel mines along expected attack routes, and patrols ventured into the outskirts of Sieraków and Truskaw.

On 15 or 16 September, two German armored cars approached from Palmiry. The attack came at an inopportune moment, as Polish sappers had not yet armed mines laid on the Palmiry–Pociecha road. Arming them under enemy fire cost two soldiers' lives, but their sacrifice halted the attack – one vehicle hit a mine, and the other retreated. A machine gun and a 20 mm cannon were salvaged from the wrecked vehicle. (Note: In a report dated 17 September, the commander of the Kampinos Group, Major Alfons Kotowski, codenamed Okoń, informed the Chief of Staff of the Home Army Headquarters, General Tadeusz Pełczyński, codenamed Grzegorz, that during the battles fought near Pociecha on 15–16 September, Home Army soldiers destroyed an armored car with mines and captured three vehicles, a motorcycle, a "rapid-fire gun", and a light machine gun. Their own losses were reported to be limited to one killed and one wounded (Koszada (2007, p. 135)).)

Mid-month, the Germans made a more determined bid to seize Pociecha (dated by Polish sources to 15 or 17 September). A battalion-sized German gendarmerie unit attacked from Sieraków. Mines and Polish machine-gun fire stopped the advance, inflicting heavy losses – estimated at 15 killed and 18 wounded.

Days later, the Kampinos "artillery" under 2nd Lieutenant Leszczyc eliminated an enemy machine-gun nest near the Pociecha–Truskaw road, which had been a persistent threat to the defenders.

== Operation Falling Star ==
The presence of a strong partisan group behind the front line caused significant concern for German command. With the Soviet offensive stalled and the Warsaw Uprising waning, the Germans deemed mid-September an opportune moment to eliminate the Kampinos Group. Operation Sternschnuppe (Falling Star), led by General Friedrich Bernhardt, involved a combined tactical group with artillery, armor, and air support, exceeding the strength of a standard infantry division.

Operation Sternschnuppe began on 27 September, with German forces striking Polish positions in the eastern and southeastern Kampinos Forest, including Pociecha. The hamlet was defended by a company under Lieutenant Nawrot from the Sochaczew Battalion and a platoon from the 3rd Squadron of the 27th Uhlan Regiment, led by Corporal Antoni Burdziełowski, codenamed Wir. Around noon, German infantry, supported by three tanks, attacked. The defenders suffered relatively heavy losses but repelled initial assaults with mortar and PIAT fire. The Germans withdrew about half a kilometer and began systematic shelling. As pressure mounted, Lieutenant Nawrot shifted a platoon under Lieutenant Borek from the exposed left wing to another sector. The Germans exploited this, bypassing the dune outpost without significant resistance. Facing encirclement, Home Army soldiers retreated about two kilometers from their original positions. An attempt to retake the lost ground failed under German artillery fire, though the Poles held forest positions north of the village. Józef Krzyczkowski estimated that five Pociecha defenders died that day, with four wounded; German losses were two killed and three wounded.

Following a plan devised weeks earlier, Major Okoń decided to withdraw the Kampinos Group from the forest and move toward the Świętokrzyskie Mountains. No attempt was made to reclaim Pociecha. At 10:00 PM, all forward Polish outposts were ordered to disengage and join a column forming in Wiersze. An hour later, the Kampinos Group began its westward retreat.

== Commemoration ==
In Pociecha, a monument honoring the Jerzyki Company soldiers who died defending the hamlet stands on a small, walled elevation. It features a stylized cross and an angled plaque.

== Bibliography ==
- Borkiewicz, Adam (1969). Powstanie warszawskie. Zarys działań natury wojskowej [Warsaw Uprising: An Outline of Military Operations] (in Polish). Warsaw: Pax.
- Koszada, Jerzy (2007). "Grupa Kampinos". Partyzanckie zgrupowanie Armii Krajowej walczące w Powstaniu Warszawskim ["Kampinos Group". The Home Army Partisan Formation Fighting in the Warsaw Uprising] (in Polish). Warsaw: ZP GRUPA Sp. z o.o. ISBN 978-83-925916-6-5.
- Krzyczkowski, Józef (1962). Konspiracja i powstanie w Kampinosie [Conspiracy and Uprising in Kampinos] (in Polish). Warsaw: Ludowa Spółdzielnia Wydawnicza.
- Podgóreczny, Marian (2010). "Doliniacy". Niepodległa Rzeczpospolita Kampinoska [Independent Kampinos Republic] (in Polish). Vol. II. Warsaw: BMT ERIDIA. ISBN 978-83-930539-3-3.
- Sawicki, Jacek Zygmunt (2002). "Obroża" w konspiracji i Powstaniu Warszawskim. Dzieje Armii Krajowej na przedpolu Warszawy ["Obroża" in Conspiracy and the Warsaw Uprising: The History of the Home Army on Warsaw's Forefront] (in Polish). Warsaw: Bellona. ISBN 83-11-09407-1.
- Sawicki, Tadeusz (2010). Rozkaz zdławić powstanie. Niemcy i ich sojusznicy w walce z powstaniem warszawskim. Warszawa: Wydawnictwo Bellona. ISBN 978-83-11-11892-8.
