= Izabelin =

Izabelin may refer to the following places:

- Izabelin, Lublin Voivodeship (east Poland)
- Izabelin, Podlaskie Voivodeship (north-east Poland)
- Izabelin, Zgierz County in Łódź Voivodeship (central Poland)
- Izabelin, Legionowo County in Masovian Voivodeship (east-central Poland)
- Izabelin, Mińsk County in Masovian Voivodeship (east-central Poland)
- Izabelin, Płock County in Masovian Voivodeship (central Poland)
- Izabelin, Gmina Kleczew in Greater Poland Voivodeship (central Poland)
- Izabelin, Gmina Kramsk in Greater Poland Voivodeship (central Poland)
- Izabelin, Gmina Krzymów in Greater Poland Voivodeship (central Poland)
- Izabelin, Turek County in Greater Poland Voivodeship (central Poland)
- Gmina Izabelin, a rural gmina in Warsaw West County, Masovian Voivodeship, Poland
  - Izabelin, Warsaw West County, the seat of Gmina Izabelin
  - Izabelin B, a village within Gmina Izabelin
  - Izabelin C, a village within Gmina Izabelin
- Izabelin, Grodno Region (west Belarus)
