= Róża Czacka =

Polish religious sister (1876–1961)

Blessed Róża Czacka
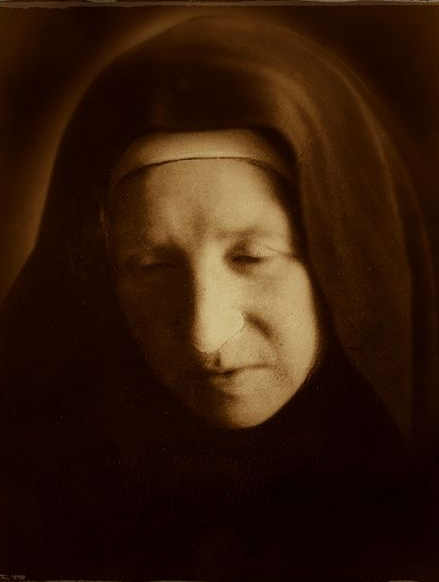
- Born: 22 October 1876; Bila Tserkva, Kiev Governorate, Russian Empire
- Died: 15 May 1961 (aged 84); Laski, Izabelin, Warsaw, Poland
- Venerated in: Catholic Church
- Beatified: 12 September 2021, Temple of Divine Providence, Wilanów, Warsaw, Poland by Cardinal Marcello Semeraro
- Feast: 19 May

Countess Róża Maria Czacka (also known under religious name Elżbieta; 22 October 1876 – 15 May 1961) was a Polish religious sister who founded the Franciscan Sisters Servants of the Cross. Czacka had an accident in her childhood that later led to her becoming blind after she turned 22 despite the numerous surgical interventions that were performed on her. The next decade saw Czacka travel throughout Europe hoping to learn about techniques that she could use to help the blind; she adapted Polish phonetics into the Braille alphabet that ended up becoming mandated in all schools for the blind since 1934. Czacka entered the Franciscan Third Order in 1917 before founding her own religious congregation in late 1918 based on ideas that she had formulated since at least 1915. Her work received approval from the apostolic nuncio Achille Ratti (the future Pope Pius XI) who lauded her efforts as an exceptional apostolate. In 1950 she retired her role as the Superior General for her order (having held the post since around 1923) due to her declining health.

The process for her beatification launched in 1988 in her native Poland before it moved to Rome for further investigation. Pope Francis confirmed her heroic virtue and named her as Venerable on 9 October 2017 before later approving a miracle attributed to her in late 2020. This latter confirmation enabled for Czacka to be beatified in Warsaw on 12 September 2021.

== Life ==
=== Early life and education ===
Róża Czacka was born in Bila Tserkva in Kiev Governorate as the sixth of seven children to Count Feliks Czacki and Countess Zofia Ledóchowska. Her great-grandfather was Tadeusz Czacki and her uncle was Cardinal Włodzimierz Czacki. The Czacki family of the Świnka coat of arms came from Silesia and were part of the Polish nobility. Many outstanding ancestors contributed to its importance, including Cardinal Włodzimierz Czacki, the secretary to and friend of Pope Pius IX and later advisor to Pope Leo XIII. Róża's father was the grandson of Tadeusz Czacki, the founder of Krzemieniec Lyceum, member of the Commission of National Education, co-author of the May 3rd Constitution and co-founder of the Warsaw Society of Friends of Learning. Through her mother, Zofia, she was related to Cardinal Mieczysław Ledóchowski. Róża had had five siblings. In her childhood she learnt how to play on the piano and also learnt how to ride horses. Czacka also became proficient in English and also mastered German and French; she also studied ecclesial and medieval Latin.

The Czacki family ensured that their children were very well educated. Róża received a thorough home education. In addition to basic school subjects, she mastered modern French, English, German, and Russian. She read French literature. Gifted with a very good ear for music, Róża took singing, dancing and piano lessons. She also went horse riding. The lessons were initially provided by her mother, but when Róża became an adolescent, governesses were hired. The Czacki family was wealthy, which allowed for the selection of appropriate teaching staff and educational activities. The parents required from their children considerable independence and self-discipline, and paid particular attention to virtues such as modesty and respect for the dignity of others, including those who were of lower social status. Róża's mother had a strict approach towards her children and tried to avoid expressing warm feelings.

=== Blindness ===
Since childhood, Róża experienced health problems. Eye disease, a hereditary disease, turned out to be a particularly difficult challenge. Additionally, she struggled because those closest to Róża refused to accept her progressive blindness. Both at home and beyond, Róża's parents avoided the subject of her disability. They concealed the problem even though the disease was making it increasingly more difficult for their daughter to function. Róża's paternal grandmother, Pelagia Czacka, was a very important person in her life. Róża owed her patriotic and religious upbringing to her to a large extent. She learned to read on her lap.

The turning point came in 1898, when as a result of falling off a horse, the retinas of both of Róża's eyes became detached. At the age of 22, she became completely blind. The time of hiding the inconvenient truth by her loved ones was over.

Róża's parents spared no efforts to restore her daughter's sight. It was hoped this would be achieved thought trips abroad to the most renowned ophthalmologists. These, however, proved fruitless. The breakthrough finally came when Róża turned to the ophthalmologist Bolesław Ryszard Gepner, who told her: ‘Don’t allow yourself to be carted from one foreign fame to another. There is nothing here that can be done, the state of your eyesight is quite hopeless. You’d be better off taking care of the blind, as they are not looked after by anyone in Poland’. Her doctors told her that there were no available options for her to recover her sight nor options to help her manage her condition since the Braille alphabet had not been available in Poland.

Róża decided to start her mission to help the blind through charitable work. She visited the patients of ophthalmic clinics, contacted doctors who could treat them and organized fundraising at Holy Cross Church in Warsaw. In this charity work, she was supported by her mother, whose approach to her daughter had now warmed. Róża came to the conclusion that her aid to those in need should not be limited to sporadic actions. She traveled to the West to learn how to organize institutional care for the blind. She found inspiration in the outstanding French promoter of braille Maurice de la Sizeranne.

=== Apostolate ===
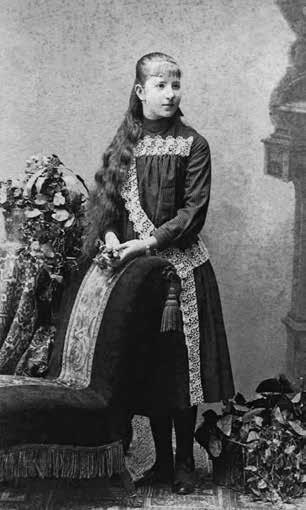
Czacka pictured in 1880.

After returning to Warsaw in 1910, Czacka opened and maintained from her funds a shelter for young blind women, where she taught them to read braille. These lessons started also being attended by blind males. The small center soon expanded its activities, and in 1911 it became the Society for the Care of the Blind, whose official status was confirmed that same year by the tsarist authorities. The Society ran care and educational facilities for the blind, including: a primary school with Polish as the language of instruction, a basket-weaving workshop for boys and male adults, a nursery for the youngest children and a nursing home for elderly women. In 1912, Czacka also established so-called ‘patronage’, i.e. organized open care of the blind. She instigated the transcribing of books into Braille. In 1913, she founded the first library for the blind in Poland. Due to the expansion of its activities, the Society moved its headquarters to larger premises in Złota Street.

Czacka had her own concept of comprehensive aid for the blind, inspired by solutions that had been tried and tested in other countries. Róża drew attention to the fact that the blind suffer not only on account of their disability, but also due to ingrained social perceptions of their supposed mental and psycho-physical debilities. She considered it a mistake to exclude blind people from everyday activities or to keep them in isolation. Such treatment resulted in feelings of resignation, withdrawal, embitterment and loneliness. Czacka tried to combat prevailing stereotypes though education and the example of her own active life. By writing studies, various appeals and memoranda to representatives of the authorities she popularized knowledge about the blind. Her goal as an organizer of aid for people without sight was to provide them with maximal independence, enabling them to find their place in society with a sense of being useful and having their own dignity. Czacka felt this attitude should be instilled into children as early as possible, already at the preschool age. According to her: "All of preschool education is an essential foundation for comprehensive and professional instruction as well as for developing the correct attitude to the life of someone who wants to achieve maximum competence and independence". As for the vocational preparation of people with blindness, she drew on examples from England and Ireland, where effective vocational training methods for the blind had been successfully applied.

The work she had begun was halted by the outbreak of the First World War. Her Society struggled with serious shortages of food and other items essential for everyday existence. It was forced to limit its activities. Czacka left Warsaw for three years, 1915–1918, and moved to Wołyń (Volhynia). She settled in Żytomierz, the capital of the Łuck- Żytomierz diocese, where many inhabitants of Poland's eastern territories found refuge. Initially, she lived in the home of the habitless sisters of the Third Order of St Francis. She planned to found a new congregation whose major mission would be to serve the blind. Under the direction of her confessor, Fr Władysław Krawiecki, a lecturer at the Żytomierz seminary, she completed her individual novitiate. Róża took her vows and adopted the religious name of Elżbieta (Elisabeth). After the ban on wearing religious garments was officially lifted, she donned the Franciscan habit. In the spring of 1918, before the end of the war, she returned to Warsaw as a consecrated person.

In order to be able to receive candidates to the newly founded Franciscan Sisters Servants of the Cross (FSC), Czacka acquired permission from the Church authorities, namely Cardinal Aleksander Kakowski, with the knowledge and blessing of the then-apostolic nuncio Achilles Ratti, who later became Pope Pius XI. The accepted date for the official founding of the religious congregation was 1 December 1918. The charism of the Franciscan Sisters Servants of the Cross was the apostolate and paying penance to God for ‘the spiritual blindness of the world’. The congregation was open to blind candidates.

The congregation's first spiritual director Father Władysław Krawiecki died in 1920, and he was succeeded Father Władysław Korniłowicz. In the first years of his ministry, Korniłowicz could not oversee the order's affairs systematically. Being at the same time the director of a boarding school and lecturer at the Catholic University of Lublin, he had to travel a considerable distance from that part of Poland to Warsaw and Laski. His broad intellectual horizons and numerous contacts, however, opened up new perspectives for the FSC. On his initiative, new institutions and centers were founded, including the Library of Religious Knowledge, a publishing house and the Verbum bookshop as well as a retreat house. From 1930, Fr Korniłowicz finally set up permanent residence Laski. University students and young intelligentsia were attracted to his so-called ‘Circle’. Some of them consequently entered the FSC or the Third Order of St Francis.

Czacka's decision to include lay co-workers from the Society for the Care of the Blind in the religious life of the Congregation was initially treated with reluctance by the church authorities. They considered that connecting a charity for the blind so closely with the Catholic Church, or rather a religious congregation would hinder the latter's mission. This, however, did not happen. Czacka was convinced that her sisters could provide comprehensive aid to the blind only with the help of the laity. Among these, a particularly important role was played by the tertiaries: members of the Third Order of St Francis, whose spiritual instructor was Władysław Korniłowicz. Róża Czacka perceived the religious congregation she had founded as one of three elements of her work. The second was Society for the Care of the Blind, which she headed. The third were the apostolic outposts headed by Władysław Korniłowicz. In 1924, Czacka and Korniłowicz gave the entirety of the organizations they had founded the collective name of Triuno, i.e. ‘three in one’. This was in reference to: the blind, the sisters and the lay workers as well as the charitable, educative-typhological and apostolic activities.

The religious order's constitutions were confirmed on 2 October 1922. Its legal existence was regulated as diocesan, single-chapel congregation, whose members took simple vows.

The Society for the Care of the Blind and the religious congregation were first based in Warsaw, and then, from 1922, primarily in Laski near Warsaw, to where the schools for the blind were gradually moved. However, the office of the Society and patronage as well as the religious house remained in the capital.

In 1922, Czacka received a donation of several morgens of land from Antoni Daszewski, the owner of Laski. An important collaborator of Czacka and the builder of the Laski base was Antoni Józef Marylski, thanks to whom the blind children could be brought to Laski in 1922. That same year, all the educational institutions for the blind were also moved there, including two comprehensive schools and two vocational schools for males and females. In 1923, Laski formally became the motherhouse of the religious congregation and the permanent seat of the superior general.

Shortly before the Second World War, Czacka's work was in full bloom. By its outbreak she had turned Laski into a modern center. There, her pupils received a basic and vocational education allowing them to live on their own, financially independent, included in society and often having their dignity restored. The number of blind students as well as teachers and carers grew. There were 41 blind students in 1928. By the school year of 1938/39, there were 230 blind children, youths and adults in the boarding schools of Laski, and 437 at the Society's open centers in Warsaw, Laski, Poznań, Kraków, Wilno and Chorzów.

A few months before September 1939, the Warsaw authorities discussed with the Society for the Care of the Blind a plan to convert two of the largest Laski boarding schools into hospitals in the event of war. The war constituted a separate chapter in the history of Czacka's work. The blind students and the staff were evacuated, some were mobilized while others were sent home. Czacka together with some of the sisters returned to Warsaw, to the Society's property in Wolność Street. In Laski, Czacka left behind some of the sisters under the charge of Sister Katarzyna (Zofia Steinberg), who spoke German, to watch over the schools and to provide care for the wounded in the hospital. During the siege of Warsaw, a bomb fell on the building where Czacka was staying, and she was among the wounded. She lost an eye, which had to be removed, and the necessary operation was performed without anaesthesia. In October, the lay and religious staff as well as the blind students started returning to Laski. Approximately 75% of the buildings were destroyed. The hospital in Laski remained a branch of the Ujazdów Hospital until mid-October 1940.

In the school year of 1940/1941, the Laski kindergarten, primary school and vocational school for the blind were reactivated. At the request of the Warsaw Social Self-Help Committee, over 30 sighted war orphans were also admitted to the Laski center. The Polish Home Army (AK) was active in the area. Many people whose Warsaw houses or apartments had been destroyed also found shelter or even employment in Laski. In September 1942, at the invitation of Czacka and Fr Korniłowicz, Fr Stefan Wyszyński, the future primate of Poland, came to Laski. At the time, he was a sworn member of the AK and its army chaplain in the Żoliborz-Kampinos district. In Laski, Fr Wyszyński performed his pastoral ministry, taught children the catechism and gave lectures on Catholic social teaching to the managerial and teaching staff.

Czacka's enterprise was keenly engaged providing shelter to hiding Jews as well as blinded soldiers. The Verbum bookstore in Moniuszko Street remained active during the occupation, and served as a contact point for the underground resistance. In 1944, the staff and blind youth of Laski supported the Warsaw Uprising, helping the insurgents and refugees from the capital. The Laski hospital treated the wounded, the staff provided dressings and meals.

After the end of the war, Czacka together with her co-workers set about reorganizing the schools and training facilities in Laski as well as the congregation's religious houses in Warsaw and Żułów. Despite the difficult socio-political and economic conditions, the ideological, organizational and educational goals of Czacka's original project were implemented throughout the period of the so-called Polish People's Republic. In 1946, the Society for the Care of the Blind received state permission for the administration and use of a 70 ha agricultural estate in Sobieszewo. At the farm, the Society organized a summer place of recreation for blind children and adults. In 1956, Cardinal Stefan Wyszyński granted the Franciscan Sisters Servants of the Cross the Church of St Martin together with monastery rooms in the Warsaw Old Town. Also in the 1950s, Zofia Kossak-Szczucka bequeathed to Czacka's project the Pedagogical Lyceum building in Rabka. An organization founded in New York in 1946, the Committee for the Blind of Poland, organized Poles who had emigrated to the United States ("Polonia") to assist the Laski school in its efforts to improve the facility. This organization would provide over the next 50 years substantial funding, expertise and guidance which covered much of the construction costs that expanded and improved the Laski campus into a modern facility. This funding, raised from individual donations, would prove to be the single largest source of private donations to Poland in the post-War era.

Sisters of the congregation's general council supported its founder in the administrative work. Many outstanding priests and preachers were associated with Czacka and Laski. Apart from the aforementioned Władysław Korniłowicz and Stefan Wyszyński, noteworthy contributors included: Jan Zieja, Tadeusz Fedorowicz and Bronisław Dembowski. Active here were also eminent scientists, educators and pioneers of Polish special pedagogics, including Maria Grzegorzewska and Wanda Szuman.

=== Death ===
Due to illness, Róża Czacka withdrew from active work in 1950. She died in Laski on 15 May 1961.

== Beatification ==
The beatification process launched after Cardinal Józef Glemp petitioned authorities in Rome to provide approval for the canonization cause. The diocesan process launched on 22 December 1987; the diocesan process concluded in September 1995. The C.C.S. later received the findings from the diocesan investigation before validating the findings on 3 April 1998 after determining that the investigation adhered to their official guidelines.

In 2011 the postulation (the officials leading the cause) submitted the official Positio dossier to the C.C.S. for evaluation. The dossier highlighted her life and listed the reasons for her sanctification according to the cardinal and theological virtues. Theologians first had to assess and approve the cause before the cardinals and bishops in the C.C.S. made the final determination if it could go to the pope for his approval. Pope Francis confirmed her heroic virtue and issued a decree that named her as Venerable on 9 October 2017.

Her beatification depended upon papal confirmation of a miracle that neither science or medicine could explain. The process to investigate a healing dating back to 2010 closed in Warsaw on 5 June 2018 before it was submitted to Rome for further assessment. The medical experts advising the C.C.S. issued their approval to the case on 9 January 2020. Theologians later approved this miracle on the fact that it came due to her intercession; the C.C.S. confirmed this that October. Pope Francis confirmed this miracle on 27 October 2020 that enabled for Czacka to be beatified; the beatification took place in Warsaw on 12 September 2021 alongside Cardinal Stefan Wyszyński.

The current postulator for this cause is Monsignor Sławomir Oder.
