= Katarzyna Ewa Zdanowicz-Cyganiak =

Polish poet and journalist

Katarzyna Ewa Zdanowicz-Cyganiak (née Zdanowicz) (born in 1979) is a Polish poet and journalist. Author of poetry volumes Improwizacje i nie tylko (Improvisations and Not Only Those), Poznajmy się (Let's Get Acquainted), Kolekcjonerka (The She-collector), Szkliwo (Enamel), Jak umierają małe dziewczynki? (How Do Little Girls Die?) and deadline. In 2004 she wrote a scholarly book about Maria Komornicka Kto się boi Marii K.? Sztuka i wykluczenie (Who Is Afraid of Maria K.? Art and Exclusion). Her newest publication is the 30 September 2007 collection of 41 new poems in Polish titled deadline. As opposed to her earlier works, published under the authorship of Katarzyna Ewa Zdanowicz, this one was published under her married name as Katarzyna Zdanowicz-Cyganiak.

Some of her poems have been translated into English by Marek Ługowski and circulated and discussed on Usenet's rec.arts.poems. Her prepared 40-poem English-language debut is still awaiting a publisher.
