= Adolf Pilch =

Polish resistance fighter (1914–2000)

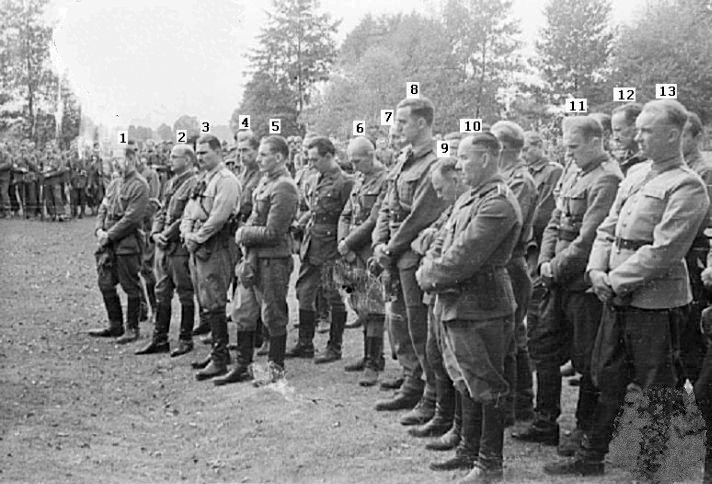
- Field mass for Polish partisans in the Kampinos Forest, late 1944. Pilch is third from the left (click on image for zoom and full description).
- Born: 22 May 1914; Wisła, Austrian Silesia
- Died: 26 January 2000 (aged 85); London
- Military career
- Allegiance: Poland
- Branch: infantry, special ops (cichociemny)
- Service years: 1939
- Rank: Major
- Nicknames: Góra, Dolina
- Commands: partisan commander
- Conflicts: battle of France, Polish resistance in occupied Poland
- Awards: Virtuti Militari Krzyz Walecznych (4 times)

Adolf Pilch, codenames Góra and Dolina

Adolf Pilch (22 May 1914 – 26 January 2000) was a Polish resistance fighter during World War II (codenames Góra and Dolina). He became part of the Polish special forces (cichociemni) trained in the United Kingdom, and was parachuted into occupied Poland on 17 February 1943. There, as a member of the Armia Krajowa Polish resistance, he organized a cavalry partisan unit in the Nowogródek area, and broke through to the Kampinos Forest near Warsaw, taking control of this area. At its height of operations his unit consisted of up to 1000 men. Between 3 June 1943 and 17 January 1945 his partisans fought in 235 battles.

== Life ==
Adolf Pilch was born in Wisła. He attended the school for Polish officer cadets (podchorąży), and was assigned to the 26th Infantry Division. He was not, however, mobilized during the German invasion of Poland; he would escape the country through Hungary and Yugoslavia and join the recreated Polish Army in France. In France he was assigned to the Polish 3rd Infantry Division in France. He fought in the Battle of France, and then managed to join the Polish Army in the United Kingdom. He was assigned to Polish special forces, the cichociemni unit, which was a Polish division of the Special Operations Executive (SOE).

After training, he was parachuted into occupied Poland on the night of the 16/17 February 1943. Under the nom-de-guerre Góra he was assigned to the Polish resistance Armia Krajowa Białystok district, and soon afterwards to the Nowogródek (Navahrudak) district. For the next few months he fought with the Polish partisans against the Nazi German forces and their auxiliary Belarusian collaborator units in the vicinity of the Naliboki forest. The unit under his command grew from a meager few dozens to close to 1,000 men by the end of that year.

After Soviet partisans became hostile towards Polish units loyal to the Polish government in exile, the Soviets dealt several blows to the Poles, arresting most of the local Polish commanders. In December 1943 Pilch reorganized the Polish partisans in the Nowogródek area. He made a controversial decision to accept a ceasefire with the Germans, and concentrated solely on engaging the Soviet partisans. The ceasefire with the Germans had been criticized by the high command of the Armia Krajowa, which ordered Pilch to renounce it; he, however, chose to ignore those orders. In June 1944 his unit, numbering about 1,000 men, retreated west in face of the Soviet Operation Bagration. At that time, Pilch negotiated an agreement with the command of the Armia Krajowa, which accepted him back into its ranks in return for the end of the ceasefire between Pilch forces and the Germans. He continued fighting in the ranks of the AK against the Germans, primarily in the Kampinos Forest area, supporting the Warsaw Uprising. On the night of 2 September 1944 his partisan group carried out a successful attack on formations of SS RONA stationed in the village of Truskaw. The SS battalions were defeated and scattered; 250 SS soldiers were killed and 100 wounded, while "Dolina"'s unit suffered only ten killed and ten wounded.

Eventually the advancing Soviet forces forced him to escape west once more. In January 1945 he made his way again to the United Kingdom, where he would settle permanently, unable to return to communist-controlled Poland. An activist in the Polish Underground Army's Ex-Servicemens' Association in the United Kingdom, he was finally able to visit Poland after the fall of communism in 1990.

During his time as a member of the resistance, Pilch fought in more than 200 engagements, most of them victorious, and received the Polish military honor the Silver Cross of the Virtuti Militari, in addition to several lesser medals (such as four Crosses of Valor).

He wrote memoirs of his life as a partisan, Partyzanci trzech puszcz (1992).

His funeral was held in Wandsworth, London.
