= Piotr Odmieniec Włast =

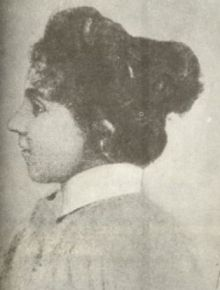
- Born: Maria Komornicka; 25 June 1876; Grabów
- Died: 8 March 1949 (aged 72); Izabelin
- Occupations: Poet, literary critic, translator

Piotr Odmieniec Włast (25 June 1876 – 8 March 1949 in Izabelin; until 1907: Maria Jakubina Komornicka) was a Polish writer of Young Poland period, translator and literary critic. Born female, rejects this identity in 1907, but returns to using feminine pronouns and the original name toward the end of life.

== Biography ==
The poet's parents were Augustyn Komornicki and Anna Dunin-Wąsowicz, and their grandfather was Teodor Anzelm Dzwonkowski (1764–1850). The writer came from an affluent landowning family, and spent the childhood in a property in Grabów. In 1889 Anna Dunin-Wąsowicz came to Warsaw with her 6 children to grant them lessons from the best teachers (Piotr was taught literature by prof. Piotr Chmielowski). Włast had a literary debut in a newspaper "Gazeta Warszawska" in 1892 with short stories Z życia nędzarza and Staszka. In 1883 the same newspaper published a novella Rozłąka. In 1894 a collection of short stories Szkice was published, in the same year „Gazeta Poznańska” published a drama Skrzywdzeni. Then, under father's pressure, Włast went to Cambridge, to attend lectures at the Newnham College for six months. The diary of the stay was published under the ironic title Youth Paradise at the beginning of 1896. After return, Włast, Wacław Nałkowski and Cezary Jellenta published in 1895 a literary manifesto Forpoczty.

In June 1898 a wedding with a poet Jan Lemański took place. The marriage was considered unsuccessful, and Lemański considered impetuous and morbidly jealous. According to Jan Lorentowicz's account, during his honeymoon, Lemański shot his wife twice with a pistol at Krakow's Planty Park. The relationship broke up after two years.

In 1900 Włast published (under the name Komornicka) Baśnie. Psalmodie, and in 1901 a cooperation with "Chimera" edited by Zenon Przesmycki started. The writer published poetry, including series Czarne Płomienie (1901), prose (Biesy, 1902), translations from English, as well as reviews, signed "Włast".

According to Maria Dernałowicz, in 1907 in the Bazar Hotel in Poznań (during a trip with mother to Kołobrzeg) Włast burned women's dresses in the oven and declared himself a man. From then on, Włast wore only men's clothing, smoked a pipe, cut hair short, and had some teeth removed (to get a more masculine facial shape) and consequently used the name Piotr Odmieniec Włast. Prof. Bogdan Zakrzewski recalled that Piotr was a friendly and very interesting interlocutor, his only condition was using masculine forms, referring to him.

Włast not only declared himself to be a man, but also recognized himself as the new incarnation of Piotr Włast, the legendary founder of the Dunin family (of Anna Dunin-Wąsowicz). Declared insane by family, Włast stayed in sanatoriums and hospitals in the years 1907–1914. In 1914 Włast returned to Grabów, to begin writing his last work, Xięgi poezji idyllicznej (Books of Idyllic Poetry). By the end of his life he had become completely forgotten as a writer. In 1944, due to war damage, Włast left the family estate; he died in a medical establishment in Izabelin in 1949. His tombstone is located at the Powązki Military Cemetery (as Maria Komornicka-Lemańska (section B / 20 (7/22)).

== Legacy ==
The work of Piotr Włast (as Maria Komornicka) was published in 1996 by literary scholar Maria Podraza-Kwiatkowska. In the eighties Maria Janion published the essay "Where is Lemańska?" dedicated to Włast - its reprint in the book „Kobiety i duch inności” (1996), as well as the publication in this book of another sketch of Janion devoted to Włast "Maria Komornicka, in memoriam", caused increased interest of the young Polish writer among scholars. In the 21st century, Włast's renaissance took place – feminist critics, LGBT scholars, and journalists became interested in the writer's life and work. Noteworthy is the monograph (565 pages) Strącona Bogini by Brygida Helbig published in 2010 in Krakow.

Wiktor Dynarski, transgender discourse scholar, stated that "Maria Komornicka has never existed/been there.". Marta Konarzewska, when writing the text about the writer published in "Replika" magazine - like Krzysztof Tomasik in Homobiografie, respected the name and gender identity chosen by the writer. Tomasik wondered in his book: "The question remains whether Włast in his metamorphosis was more concerned about becoming a man or simply a human" as at that time a woman was in fact a sub-human being, which was also pointed out by, among others, Zofia Nałkowska.

To mark the 60th anniversary of the poet's death, a monument was unveiled on 8 March 2009 by Gen. Stanisław Nałęcz-Komornicki (poet's nephew) in the hometown of Grabów nad Pilicą. In July 2016, Warka celebrated the 140th anniversary of the birth of Maria Komornicka with the participation of Brygida Helbig and Tomasz Komornicki.

== Works ==
- Szkice. Warszawa 1894
- with Wacław Nałkowski, Cezary Jellenta: Forpoczty. Lwów 1895
- Baśnie. Psalmodie. Warszawa 1900
- Maria Podraza-Kwiatkowska (red.): Utwory poetyckie prozą i wierszem. Maria Komornicka. Wydawnictwo Literackie, Kraków 1996, ISBN 83-08-02659-1.
- Komornicka, Maria (2011). Boniecki, Edward (ed.). Listy (in Polish). Warszawa: Muzeum Historyczne miasta Warszawy. ISBN 978-83-62189-01-4.
- Marya Komornicka (as Piotr Odmieniec Włast). Stelingowska, Barbara, ed. (2011). Xięga poezji idyllicznej. Rzeczy francuskie (in Polish). Translated by Joanna Majewska. trans. ed. Krzysztof Andrzej Jeżewski. Warszawa: tCHu doM Wydawniczy. ISBN 978-83-89782-48-9.
- Komornicka, Maria (2016). Zientek, Sylwia (ed.). Utwory wybrane (in Polish). Warszawa: Muza (oficyna wydawnicza). p. 152. ISBN 978-83-287-0456-5.

=== Translations ===
- Edward Bulwer-Lytton: Zanoni. Powieść z czasów rewolucyi francuskiej. T. 1–3, Warszawa 1906
- Edward Bulwer-Lytton: Zanoni. Opowieść o różokrzyżowcu. Romans mistyczny z czasów Rewolucji Francuskiej. Sandomierz 2015

=== Redaction ===
- Słówniczek muzyczny. (Harras), Warszawa 1887
