= Mościska, Warsaw West County =

Mościska
- Village
- Location within Poland
- Coordinates: 52°17′N 20°52′E
- Country: Poland
- Voivodeship: Masovian
- County: Warsaw West
- Gmina: Izabelin
- Population: 500

Mościska [mɔɕˈt͡ɕiska] is a village in the administrative district of Gmina Izabelin, within Warsaw West County, Masovian Voivodeship, in east-central Poland.
