= Izabelin B =

- Village
- Location within Poland
- Coordinates: 52°17′8″N 20°49′46″E
- Country: Poland
- Voivodeship: Masovian
- County: Warsaw West
- Gmina: Izabelin

Izabelin B is a village in the administrative district of Gmina Izabelin, within Warsaw West County, Masovian Voivodeship, in east-central Poland.
