= Izabelin, Grodno Region =

Village in Grodno Region, Belarus

Izabelin Ізабелін
- Village
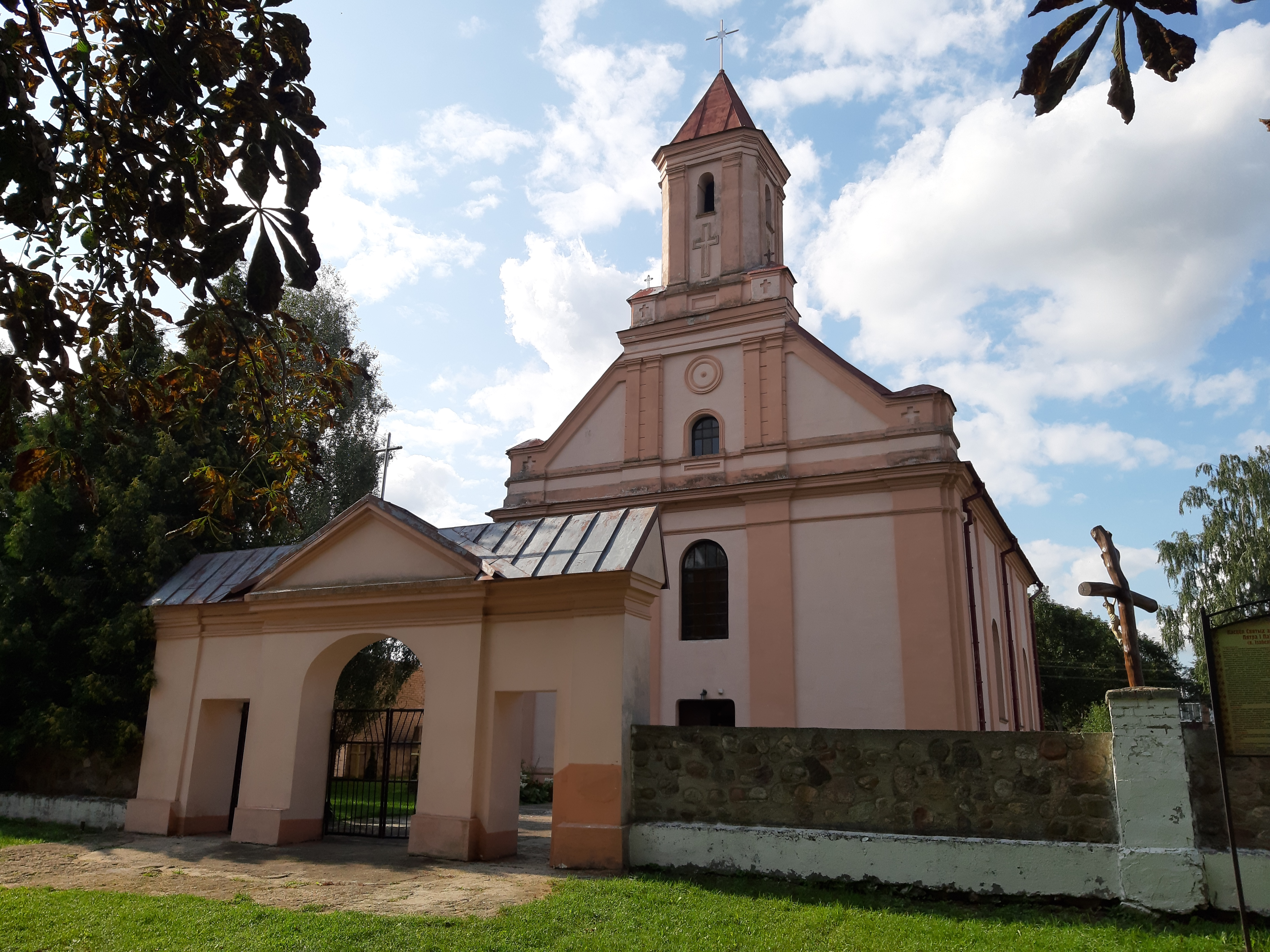

- Location within Belarus
- Coordinates: 53°7′27″N 24°20′40″E
- Country: Belarus
- Region: Grodno Region
- District: Vawkavysk District
- Founded: 18th century
- Founder: Georg Detlev von Flemming
- Named for: Izabela Czartoryska
- Time zone: UTC+3 (MSK)

Izabelin (Belarusian: Ізабе́лін; Russian: Изабе́лин; Polish: Izabelin; Yiddish: זאַבעלין) is a village in Vawkavysk District, Grodno Region, in western Belarus.

== History ==
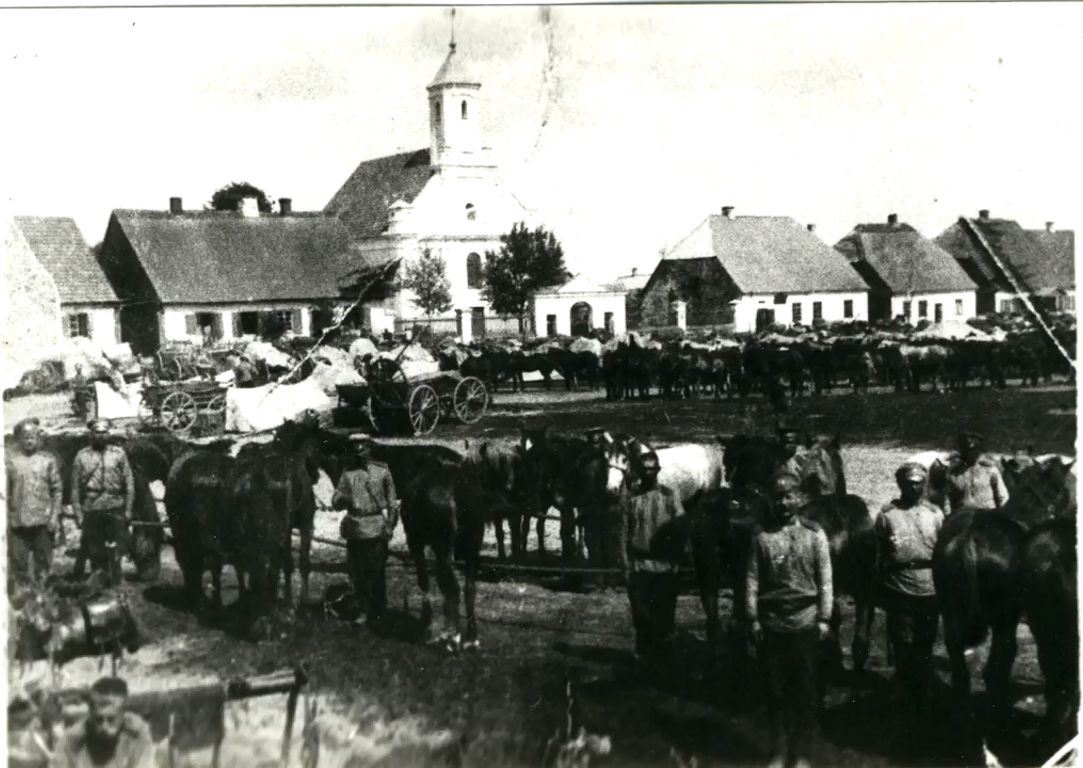
Market in 1916

Izabelin was founded under the Polish–Lithuanian Commonwealth by Georg Detlev von Flemming and named after his daughter Izabela Czartoryska. Later on, it was a private town of the Grabowski and Strawiński families.

In the interwar period, Izabelin was administratively part of Wołkowysk County in the Białystok Voivodeship of Poland. According to the 1921 census, the village together with the adjacent manor farm and settlement had a population of 689, of whom 71.7% identified as Polish, 17% as Jewish, and 10.3% as Belarusian.

After the invasion of Poland in September 1939, Izabelin was occupied by the Soviet Union until 1941, then by Nazi Germany until 1944, and again by the Soviet Union, which annexed the area from Poland in 1945.
