= Laski, Warsaw West County =

Laski
- Village
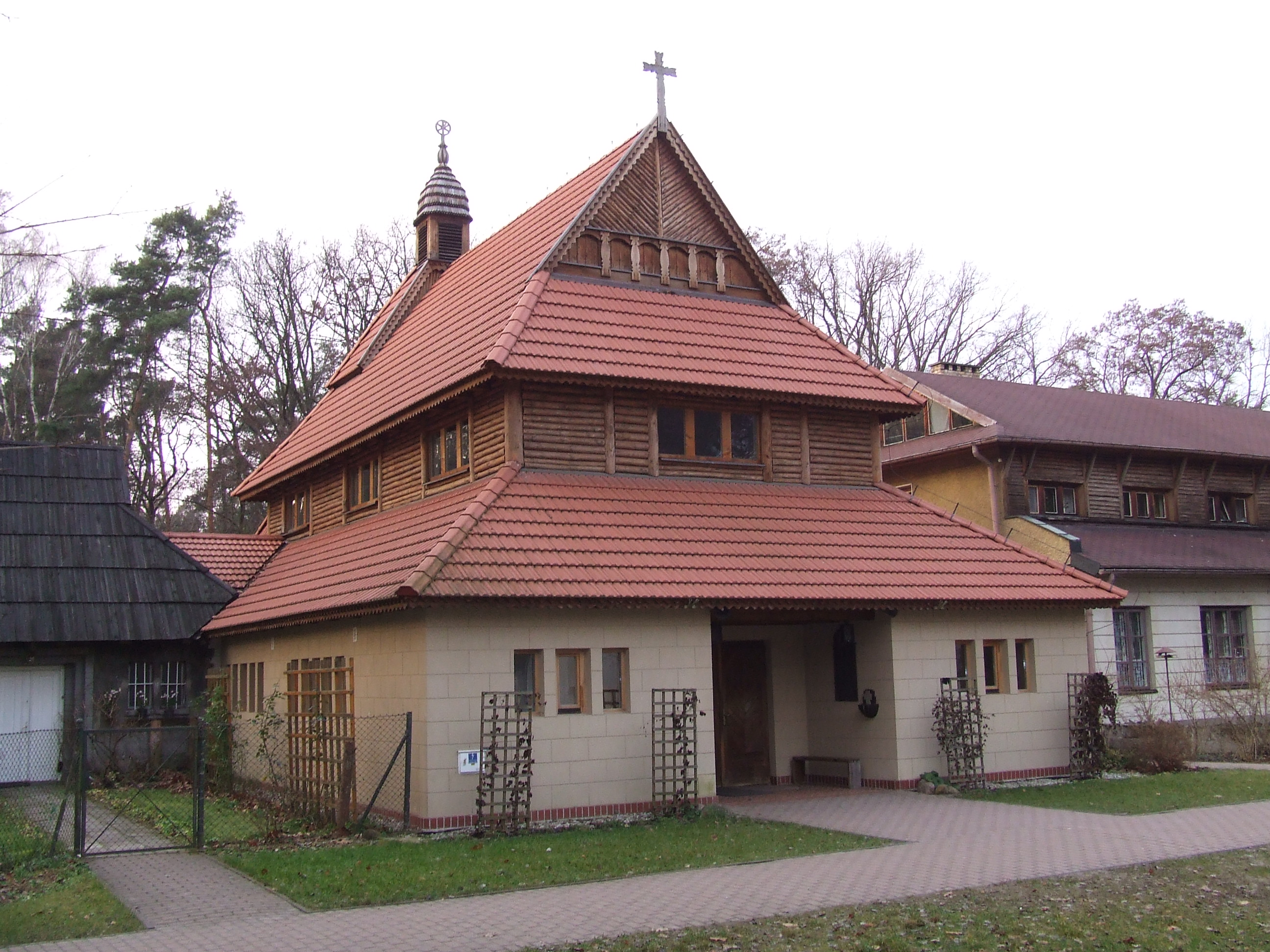
- Chapel in Laski

- Location within Poland
- Coordinates: 52°18′N 20°51′E
- Country: Poland
- Voivodeship: Masovian
- County: Warsaw West
- Gmina: Izabelin
- Population: 2,100

Laski (Polish pronunciation: [ˈlaskʲi]) is a village in Poland, in the Masovian Voivodship, to the west of Warsaw, in the commune of Izabelin. It is located at the southern border of the Kampinos Forest and is a notable resort, with 1,600 permanent inhabitants (1998).

The village is notable for its resort, hospital and schools for blind people run by Towarzystwo Opieki nad Ociemniałymi founded by countess Róża Czacka, and the Franciscan friars. In addition, a shelter for lone mothers run by Towarzystwo Pomocy im. Adama Chmielowskiego is located there. Near the blinded institute a wooden chapel is located (built in 1925), one of the most notable architectural monuments of the area. There is also a small World War II cemetery and a civilian cemetery, a final resting place of many Polish famous artists, among them are writers Antoni Słonimski and Jerzy Zawieyski.
