= Gmina Izabelin =

Gmina Izabelin Izabelin Commune
- Gmina
- Flag Coat of arms
- Interactive map of Gmina Izabelin
- Coordinates (Izabelin): 52°18′N 20°49′E
- Country: Poland
- Voivodeship: Masovian
- County: Warsaw West
- Seat: Izabelin C

Area
  - Total: 64.98 km^{2} (25.09 sq mi)

Population (2013)
  - Total: 10,523
  - Density: 161.9/km^{2} (419.4/sq mi)
- Website: http://izabelin.home.pl

Gmina Izabelin is a rural gmina (administrative district) in Warsaw West County, Masovian Voivodeship, in east-central Poland. Its seat is the village of Izabelin, which lies approximately 10 kilometres (6 mi) north of Ożarów Mazowiecki and 16 km (10 mi) north-west of Warsaw.

The gmina covers an area of 64.98 square kilometres (25.1 sq mi), and as of 2006 its total population is 10,068 (10,523 in 2013).

== Villages ==
Gmina Izabelin contains the villages and settlements of Hornówek, Izabelin (including the sołectwos called Izabelin B and Izabelin C), Laski, Mościska, Sieraków and Truskaw.

== Neighbouring gminas ==
Gmina Izabelin is bordered by the city of Warsaw and by the gminas of Czosnów, Leszno, Łomianki and Stare Babice.
