= Łubiec =

- Village
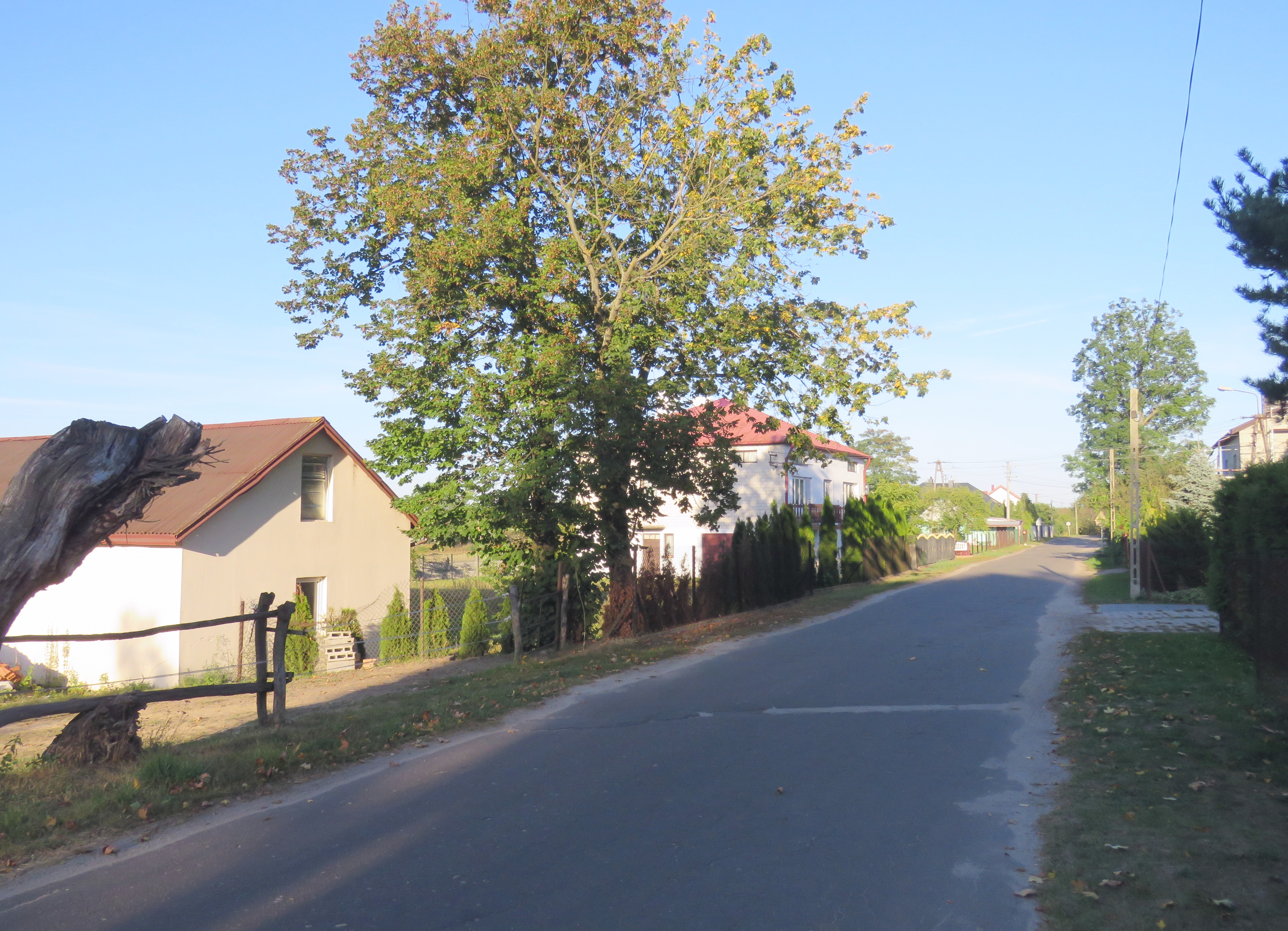
- Road through Łubiec

- Location within Poland
- Coordinates: 52°17′N 20°36′E
- Country: Poland
- Voivodeship: Masovian
- County: Warsaw West
- Gmina: Leszno

Population (approx.)
  - Wieś;: 150

Łubiec [ˈwubjɛt͡s] is a village in the administrative district of Gmina Leszno, within Warsaw West County, Masovian Voivodeship, in east-central Poland.
