= Sieraków, Warsaw West County =

Sieraków
- Village
- Location within Poland
- Coordinates: 52°19′N 20°49′E
- Country: Poland
- Voivodeship: Masovian
- County: Warsaw West
- Gmina: Izabelin
- Population (approx.): 450

Sieraków (Polish pronunciation: [ɕɛˈrakuf]) is a village in the administrative district of Gmina Izabelin, within Warsaw West County, Masovian Voivodeship, in east-central Poland.
