= Izabelin C =

- Village
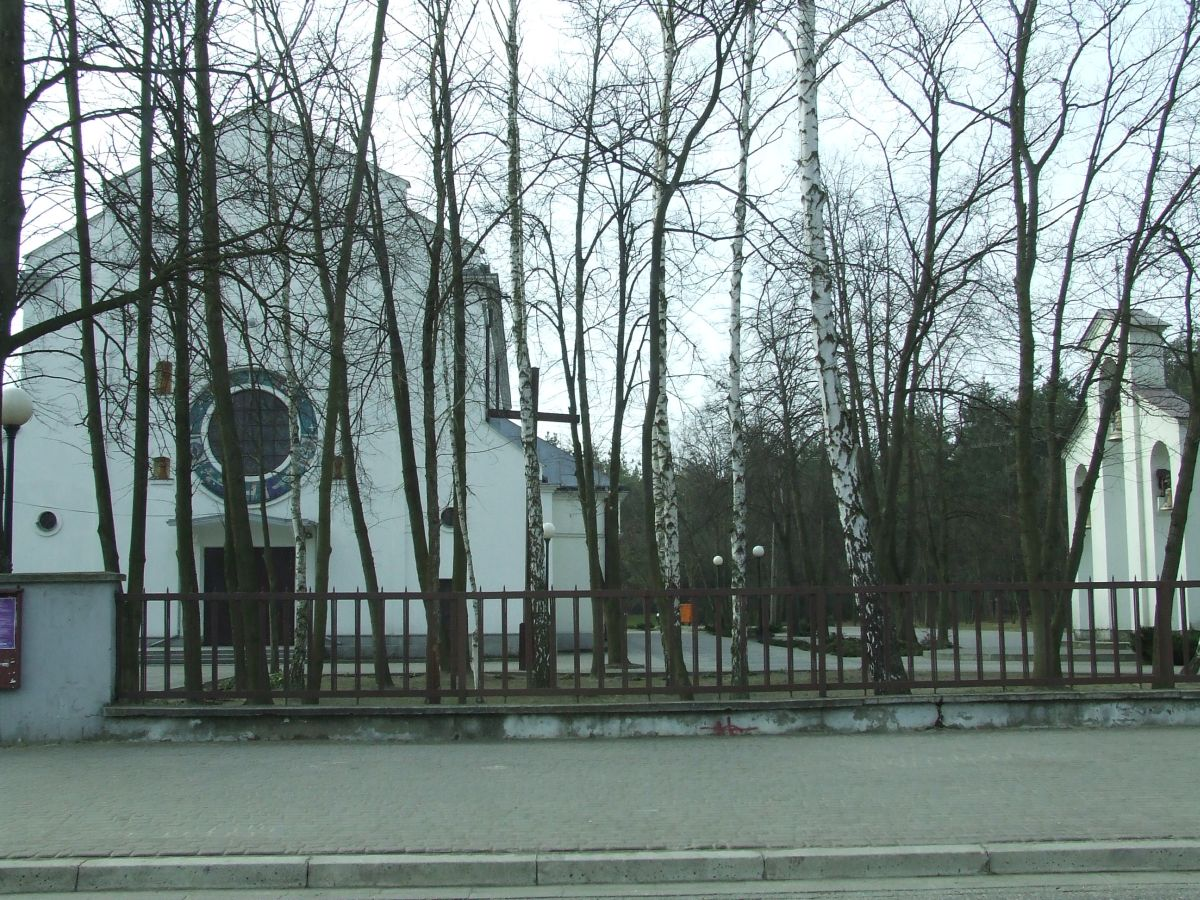

- Location within Poland
- Coordinates: 52°17′48″N 20°48′38″E
- Country: Poland
- Voivodeship: Masovian
- County: Warsaw West
- Gmina: Izabelin
- Population: 1,500

Izabelin C is a village in the administrative district of Gmina Izabelin, within Warsaw West County, Masovian Voivodeship, in east-central Poland.
