= Brzozówka, Gmina Czosnów =

Brzozówka
- Village
- Location within Poland
- Coordinates: 52°20′54″N 20°39′27″E
- Country: Poland
- Voivodeship: Masovian
- County: Nowy Dwór
- Gmina: Czosnów
- Population: 200

Brzozówka [bʐɔˈzufka] is a village in the administrative district of Gmina Czosnów, within Nowy Dwór County, Masovian Voivodeship, in east-central Poland.
