= Hornówek, Masovian Voivodeship =

Hornówek
- Village
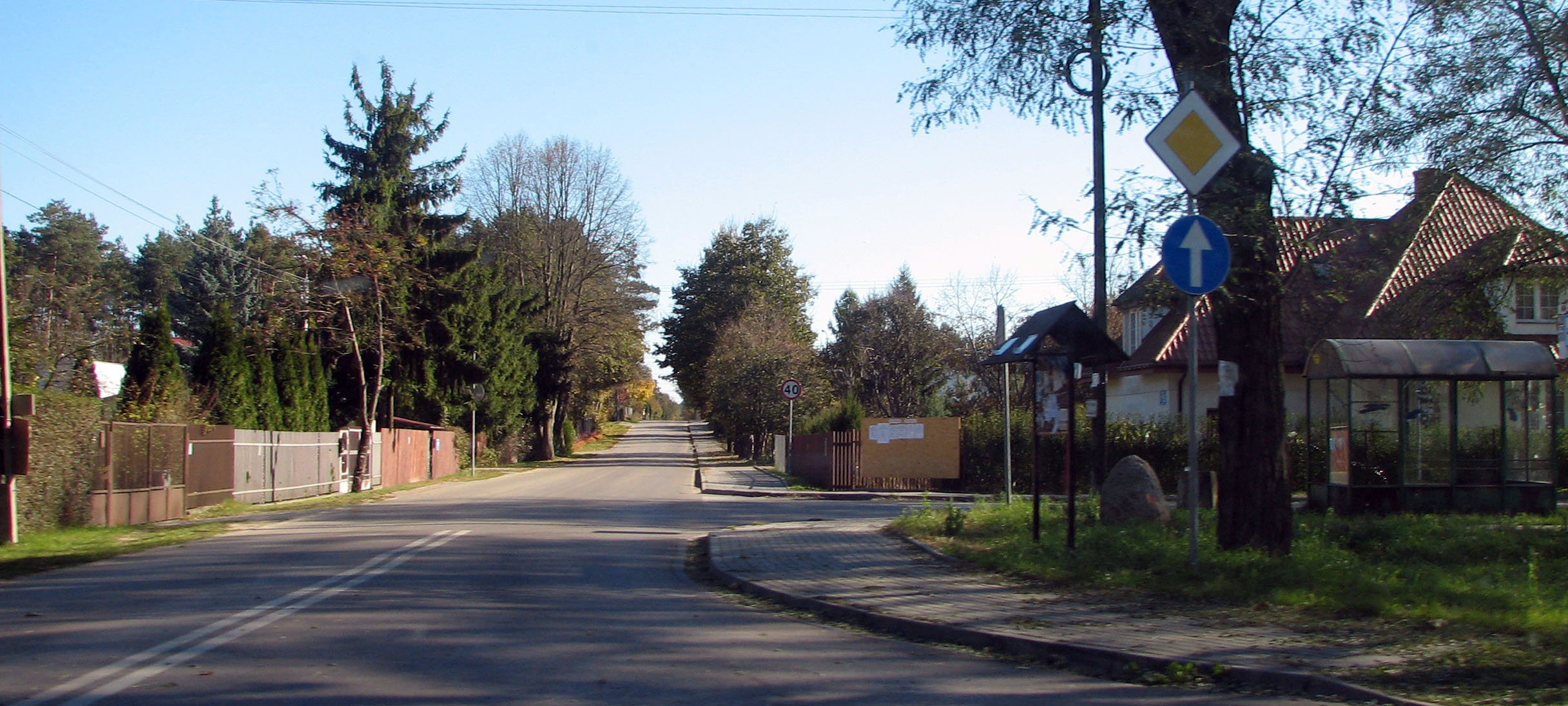

- Location within Poland
- Coordinates: 52°17′14″N 20°47′53″E
- Country: Poland
- Voivodeship: Masovian
- County: Warsaw West
- Gmina: Izabelin

Hornówek [xɔrˈnuvɛk] is a village in the administrative district of Gmina Izabelin, within Warsaw West County, Masovian Voivodeship, in east-central Poland.
