= Lipków =

- Village
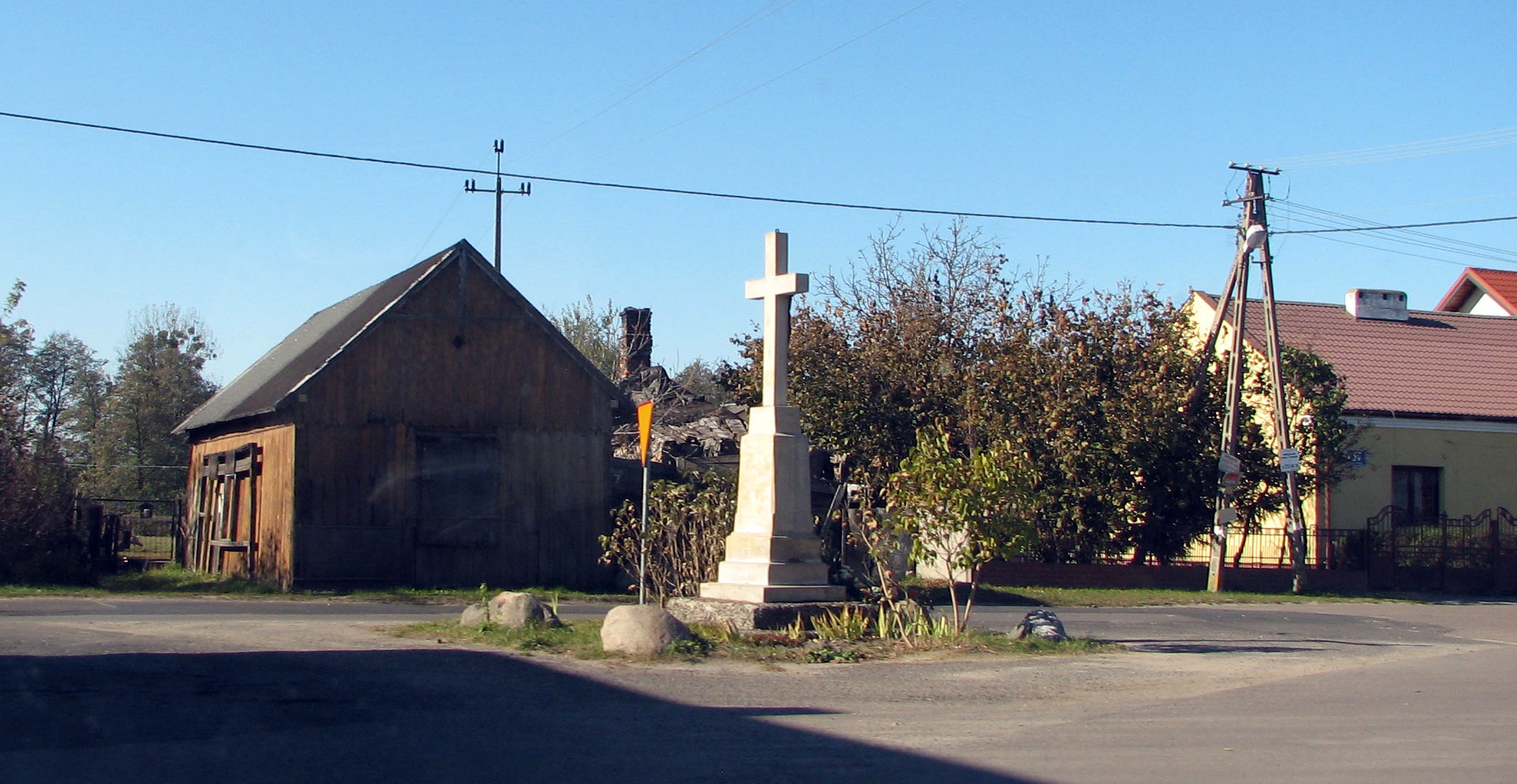

- Location within Poland
- Coordinates: 52°16′N 20°48′E
- Country: Poland
- Voivodeship: Masovian
- County: Warsaw West
- Gmina: Stare Babice
- Population (2010): 860
- Website: www.lipkow.net

Lipków [ˈlipkuf] is a village in the administrative district of Gmina Stare Babice, within Warsaw West County, Masovian Voivodeship, in east-central Poland.
