= Truskaw =

- Village
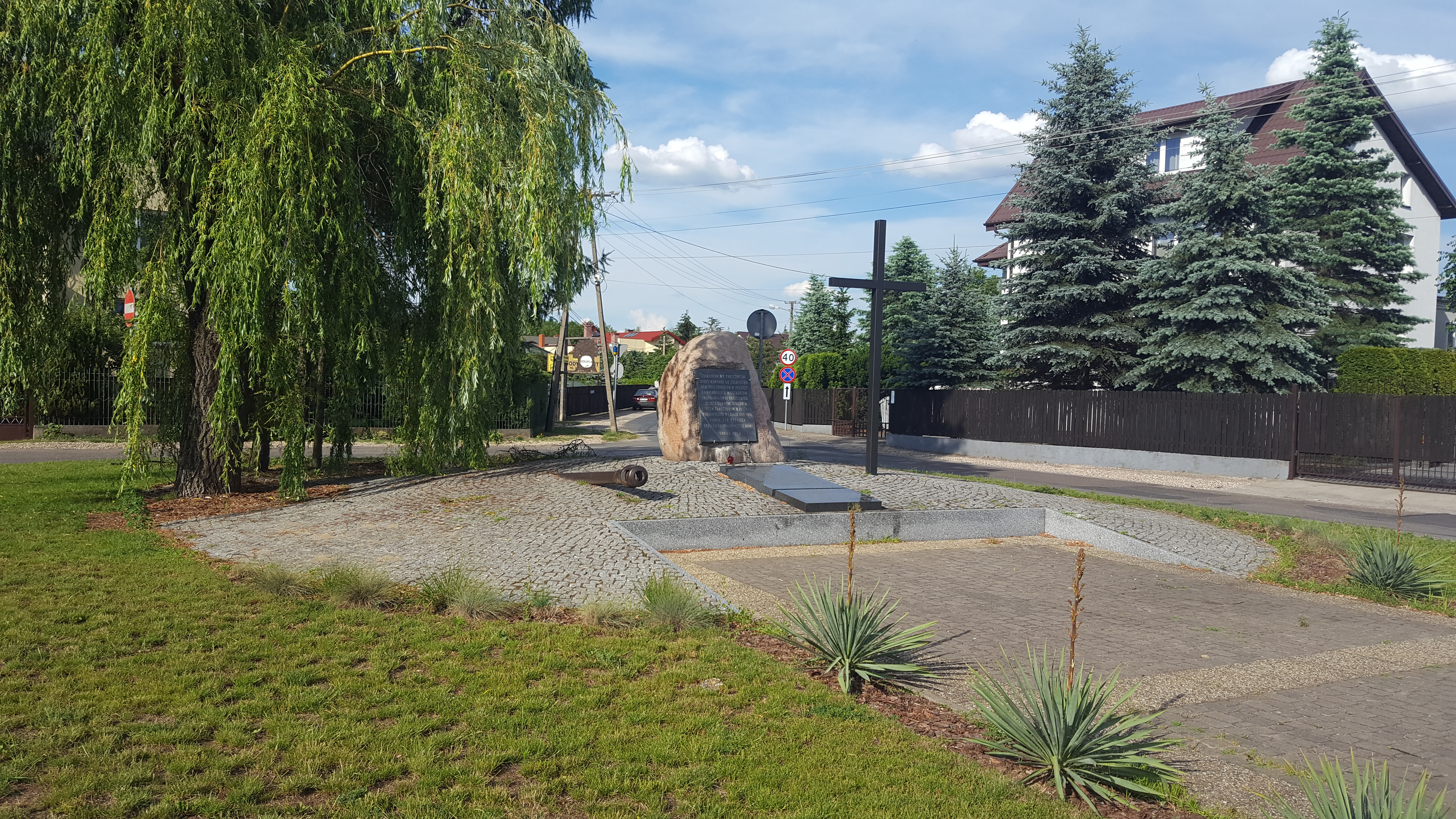
- Kampinos Group monument in Truskaw

- Location within Poland
- Coordinates: 52°18′N 20°47′E
- Country: Poland
- Voivodeship: Masovian
- County: Warsaw West
- Gmina: Izabelin
- Population: 1,400

Truskaw [ˈtruskaf] is a village in the administrative district of Gmina Izabelin, within Warsaw West County, Masovian Voivodeship, in east-central Poland.
