= Kampinos Forest =

Forest in central Poland

Kampinos Forest Polish: Puszcza Kampinoska
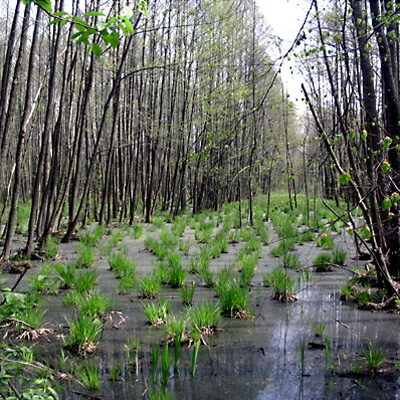
- Swamp in Kampinos Forest

- Location within Poland

Geography
- Location: Masovian Voivodeship, Poland
- Coordinates: 52°19′25″N 20°35′54″E

Administration
- Events: Palmiry massacre

Kampinos Forest (Polish: Puszcza Kampinoska) is a large forest complex located in Masovian Voivodeship, west of Warsaw in Poland.

It covers a part of the ancient valley of the Vistula basin, between the Vistula and the Bzura rivers. The forest began to form 14-11,000 years ago, at the very end of the Last Glacial Period.

Once a forest covering 670 km^{2} of central Poland, it currently covers roughly 240 km^{2}. In its present day form, most of the woodland is no longer old-growth forest but rather the remainders of a once-managed forest which is now left to grow on its own, with little human intervention.

== Kampinos National Park ==
Most of the Kampinos forest is currently protected within Kampinos National Park (Kampinoski Park Narodowy).

Among the distinctive features of the area is a combination of sandy dunes and marshes, with dense pine and spruce forest.

The forest is a Natura 2000 EU Special Protection Area.

== See also ==
- Forests of Poland
- Special Protection Areas in Poland
- Natura 2000 in Poland
