= Izabelin, Warsaw West County =

Izabelin
- Village
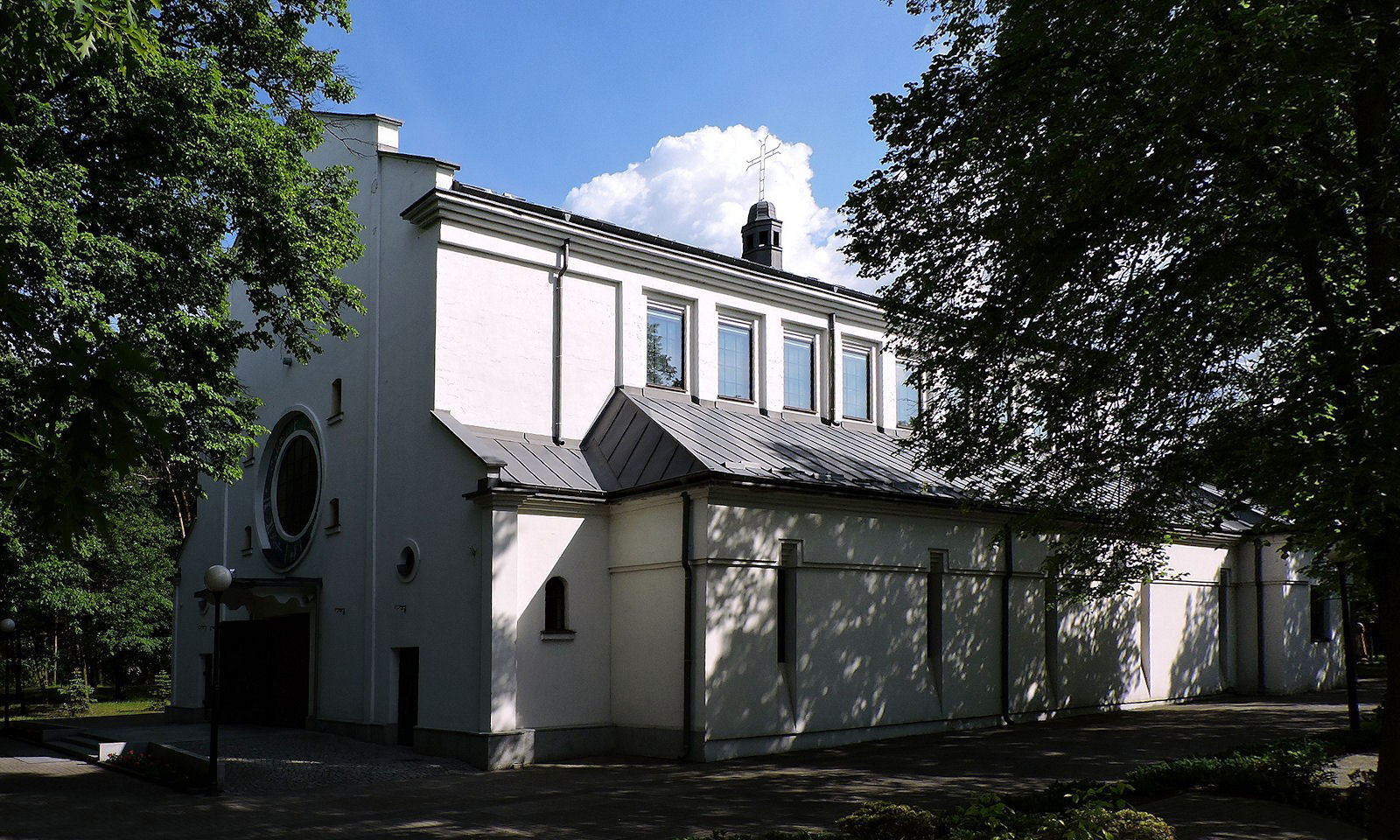
- Saint Francis church

- Coat of arms

- Location within Poland
- Coordinates: 52°18′N 20°49′E
- Country: Poland
- Voivodeship: Masovian
- County: Warsaw West
- Gmina: Izabelin
- Population: 12,500
- Time zone: UTC+1 (CET)
  - Summer (DST): UTC+2 (CEST)
- Vehicle registration: WZ

Izabelin [izaˈbɛlin] is a village in Warsaw West County, Masovian Voivodeship, in east-central Poland. It is the seat of the gmina (administrative district) called Gmina Izabelin.
