= Łaźniew-Majątek =

- Village
- Location within Poland
- Coordinates: 52°12′12″N 20°39′12″E
- Country: Poland
- Voivodeship: Masovian
- County: Warsaw West
- Municipality: Błonie
- Time zone: UTC+1 (CET)
  - Summer (DST): UTC+2 (CEST)
- Area code: +48 91
- Car plates: WZ

Łaźniew-Majątek (Polish: [ˈwaʑ.ɲɛf maˈjɔn.tɛk]) is a village in Masovian Voivodeship, Poland, located within the municipality of Błonie in Warsaw West County.

== History ==
Łaźniew-Majątek was separated from the neighbouring village of Łaźniew on 1 January 2024.
