= Bramki =

- Village
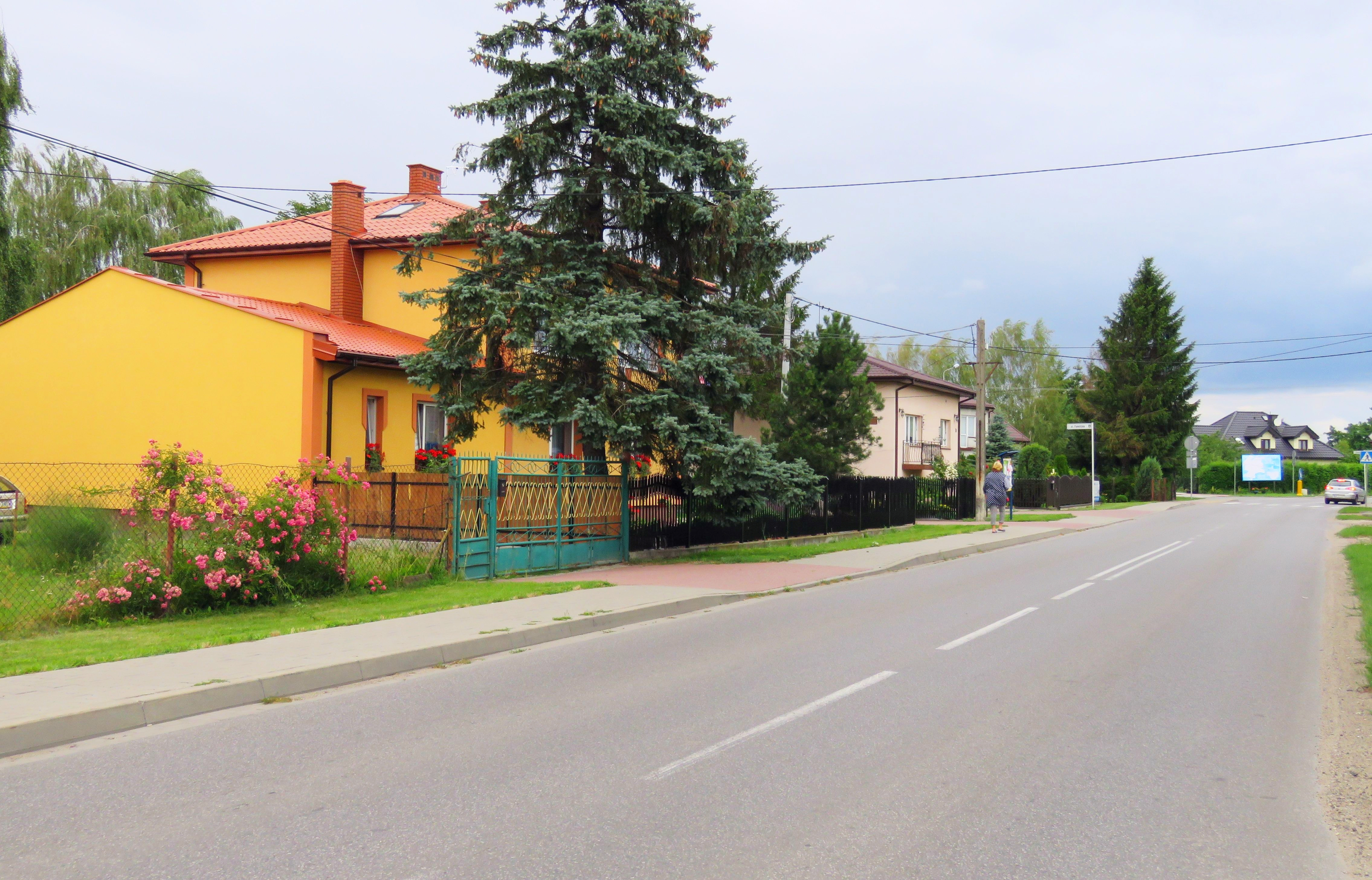

- Location within Poland
- Coordinates: 52°12′N 20°31′E
- Country: Poland
- Voivodeship: Masovian
- County: Warsaw West
- Gmina: Błonie
- Population: 1,047 (2,010)

Bramki [ˈbramki] is a village in the administrative district of Gmina Błonie, within Warsaw West County, Masovian Voivodeship, in east-central Poland.

== History ==
Bramki's name is viewed to have come from the owner of the original land that the village was built upon, Bramki Braneckie and is part of Gmina Błonie municipality. In the village there is a health centre and a church. A hospice was opened in Bramki in 2023 for palliative care, being the first such facility in the Masovian Voivodeship.

The church is the seat of the Roman Catholic parish of St. Maximilian Kolbe. According to the parish church, the idea of building a church on this site was put forward by the patron of the parish and future saint, St. Maximilian Maria Kolbe. The story claims that Kolbe was travelling by train from Łowicz to Warsaw and got off at the Boża Wola railway station. Curious about the village's name, he investigated and found a spare plot of land which he blessed and asked to buy for a church to be built there. Despite the landowner refusing to sell, Kolbe declared there would be a church in the village and it was built upon that land. The church was finally constructed in 1983. Within the structure of the Roman Catholic Church, the parish of St. Maximilian Maria Kolbe in Bramki belongs to the Warsaw metropolitan area, which is covered by the deanery of Błonie and the Archdiocese of Warsaw. In 2022, Grodziskie Przewozy Autobusowe announced a new bus route to connect Bramki with Bieniewice and Bieniewo Parcela.
