= Wawrzyszew (disambiguation) =

Wawrzyszew is a neighbourhood in Warsaw, Poland.

Wawrzyszew may also refer to:

- Wawrzyszew, Warsaw West County, a village in Warsaw West County, Masovian Voivodeship, Poland
- Wawrzyszew metro station in Warsaw, Poland
