= Wojcieszyn, Masovian Voivodeship =

Wojcieszyn
- Village
- Location within Poland
- Coordinates: 52°15′23″N 20°46′0″E
- Country: Poland
- Voivodeship: Masovian
- County: Warsaw West
- Gmina: Stare Babice
- Population (2010): 775

Wojcieszyn (Polish pronunciation: [vɔjˈt͡ɕɛʂɨn]) is a village in the administrative district of Gmina Stare Babice, within Warsaw West County, Masovian Voivodeship, in east-central Poland.
