= Nowa Wieś, Warsaw West County =

Nowa Wieś
- Village
- Location within Poland
- Coordinates: 52°12′5″N 20°32′48″E
- Country: Poland
- Voivodeship: Masovian
- County: Warsaw West
- Gmina: Błonie
- Population: 56

Nowa Wieś [ˈnɔva ˈvjɛɕ] is a village in the administrative district of Gmina Błonie, within Warsaw West County, Masovian Voivodeship, in east-central Poland.
