= Bieniewo-Parcela =

- Village
- Location within Poland
- Coordinates: 52°12′21″N 20°29′40″E
- Country: Poland
- Voivodeship: Masovian
- County: Warsaw West
- Gmina: Błonie

Bieniewo-Parcela [bjɛˈɲɛvɔ parˈt͡sɛla] is a village in the administrative district of Gmina Błonie, within Warsaw West County, Masovian Voivodeship, in east-central Poland.
