= Zielonki-Parcela =

- Village
- Location within Poland
- Coordinates: 52°15′1″N 20°49′15″E
- Country: Poland
- Voivodeship: Masovian
- County: Warsaw West
- Gmina: Stare Babice
- Population (2010): 727

Zielonki-Parcela [ʑɛˈlɔŋki parˈt͡sɛla] is a village in the administrative district of Gmina Stare Babice, within Warsaw West County, Masovian Voivodeship, in east-central Poland.
