= Cecylia Plater-Zyberk =

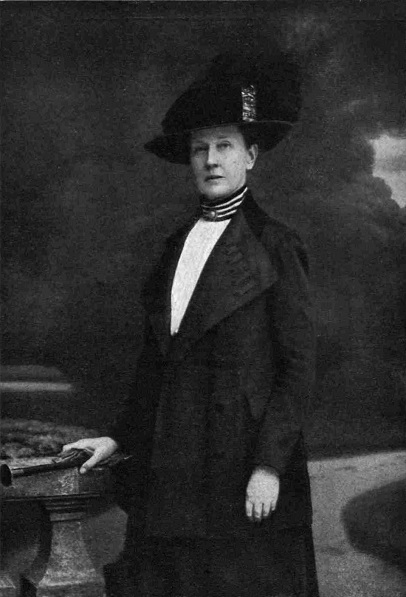
Cecylia Plater-Zyberk

Cecylia Plater-Zyberk, Plater coat of arms, (born 8 May 1853 in Pass, Poland - died 6 January 1920 in Warsaw) was a social activist, educationalist, publicist and religious. She founded several schools and charitable societies.

== Life ==
Cecylia Plater-Zyberk was the daughter and eighth child of Count Kazimierz Plater-Zyberk and Ludwika, née Borewicz. On her father's side she was descended from two illustrious German families: the Plater von Broëls from Westphalia and the Syberg zu Wischling clan originally from the Ruhr, who arrived in Courland with the Teutonic Order. After home-schooling on the family estate, "Schlossberg" in Courland, she attended the Sacred Heart school in Posen. During 1879-1880 she attended a craft school in Paris. On her return, she settled in Warsaw where she qualified as a master tailor.

In 1880 she entered the convent of the Messengers of Mother Mary in Warsaw - a religious institute that did not use the habit. For a number of years she was the superior of the Warsaw house.

In 1883 Plater-Zyberk founded a craft school for girls followed in 1886 by a girls' secondary school. In 1917 it achieved full recognition by the Education Authority. It was revived in 1993 as a private secondary girls school named after Cecylia Plater-Zyberk. Her second foundation was in Chyliczki in 1891, this time an agricultural school, also intended for girls. It became the Chyliczki agricultural High school. After the Second World War and Poland's return to full independence, the school is now called the "Cecylia Plater-Zyberk Centre for Continuing Rural Education".

In addition she put on courses on education and book-keeping.

== Social activism ==
With Kazimiera Proczek she founded the Polish Catholic Women's Association in 1904, of which she was president for two years. She was also a co-founder of the Society of Women Landowners. She set up with bishop Jerzy Matulewicz, the Friends of Young People aimed at working with young men. Her other charitable endeavours were centred on aiding children and youth.

Cecylia Plater-Zyberk died in 1920 and was buried in the family vault in Powązki Cemetery.

== Publications ==
She was the author of 35 books and pamphlets as well as many articles. She usually wrote under one of several pseudonyms - CPZ, Father Boguslaw, Heather or Ciccada. Her subject matter ranged between Pedagogy and social and religious themes, including the place of women in society. She is regarded as a precursor of Liberal Catholicism.

== Works in Polish ==
- The idea and aims of relationships - Istota i cele związków
- Living as a Catholic - Życie katolickie
- About faith and religiosity - O pobożności prawdziwej i fałszywej 1899
- A few thoughts about child-rearing - Kilka mysli o wychowaniu 1903
- Woman as Hearth: From chats with the Chyliczki pupils: by a reborn woman: rebirth - Kobieta - ogniskiem : z pogadanek do uczennic Chyliczkowskich : przez odrodzoną kobietę - odrodzenie 1909
- What is our main national vice? -Jaka jest nasza wada narodowa główna?
- On the need to reform Girls' High schools - O potrzebie reformy szkoły średniej dla dziewcząt 1917
- On the point of marriage - Na progu małżeństwa
