= Rokitno-Majątek =

- Village
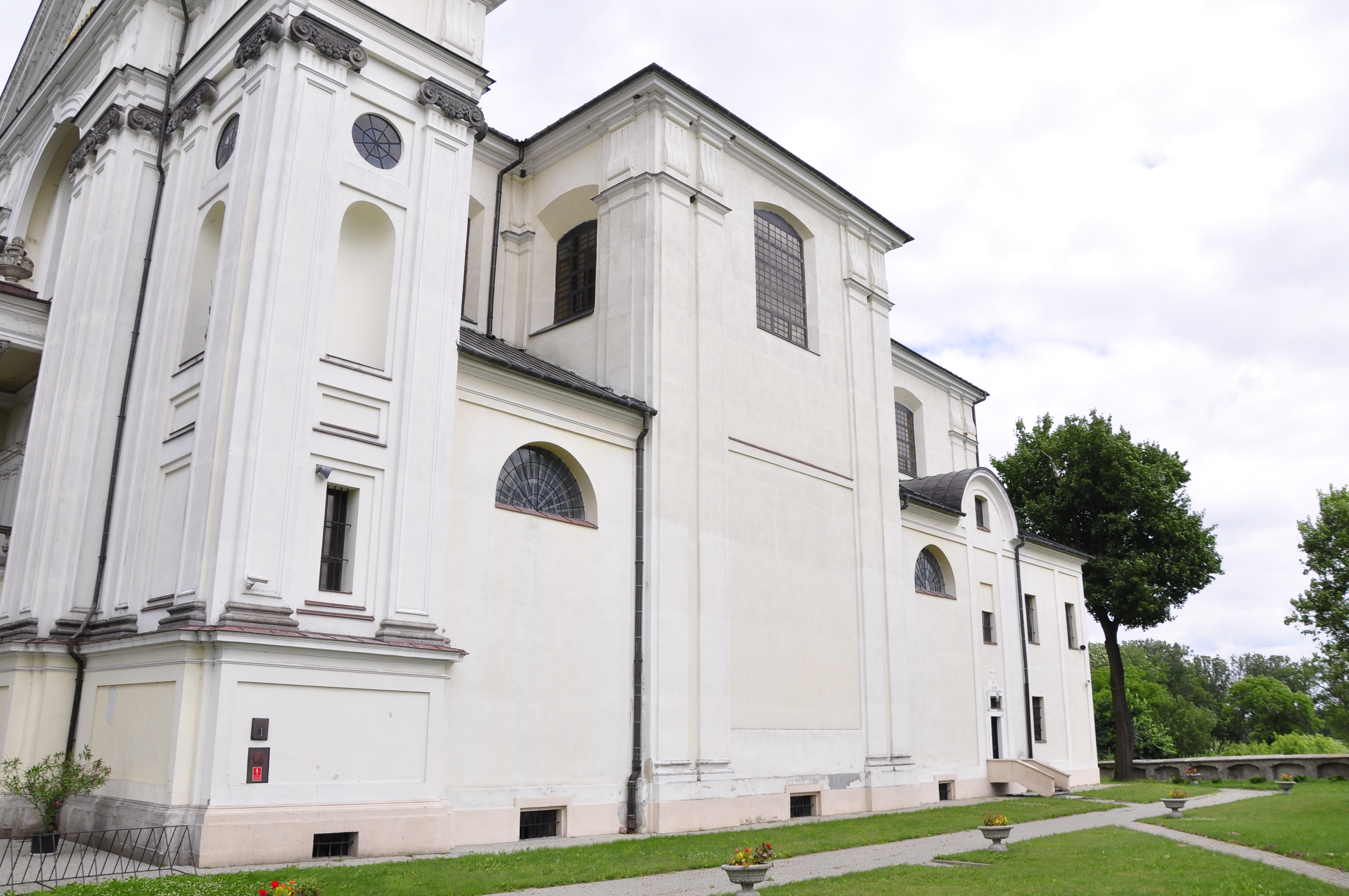
- Church in Rokitno

- Location within Poland
- Coordinates: 52°11′06″N 20°39′59″E
- Country: Poland
- Voivodeship: Masovian
- County: Warsaw West
- Gmina: Błonie

Rokitno-Majątek [rɔˈkitnɔ maˈjɔntɛk] is a village in the administrative district of Gmina Błonie, within Warsaw West County, Masovian Voivodeship, in east-central Poland.
