= Nowa Górna =

- Village
- Location within Poland
- Coordinates: 52°13′14″N 20°31′25″E
- Country: Poland
- Voivodeship: Masovian
- County: Warsaw West
- Gmina: Błonie

Nowa Górna [ˈnɔva ˈɡurna] is a village in the administrative district of Gmina Błonie, within Warsaw West County, Masovian Voivodeship, in east-central Poland.
