= Witki, Warsaw West County =

Witki
- Village
- Location within Poland
- Coordinates: 52°14′N 20°39′E
- Country: Poland
- Voivodeship: Masovian
- County: Warsaw West
- Gmina: Błonie

Witki [ˈvitki] is a village in the administrative district of Gmina Błonie, within Warsaw West County, Masovian Voivodeship, in east-central Poland.
