= Dziekanów Leśny =

- Village
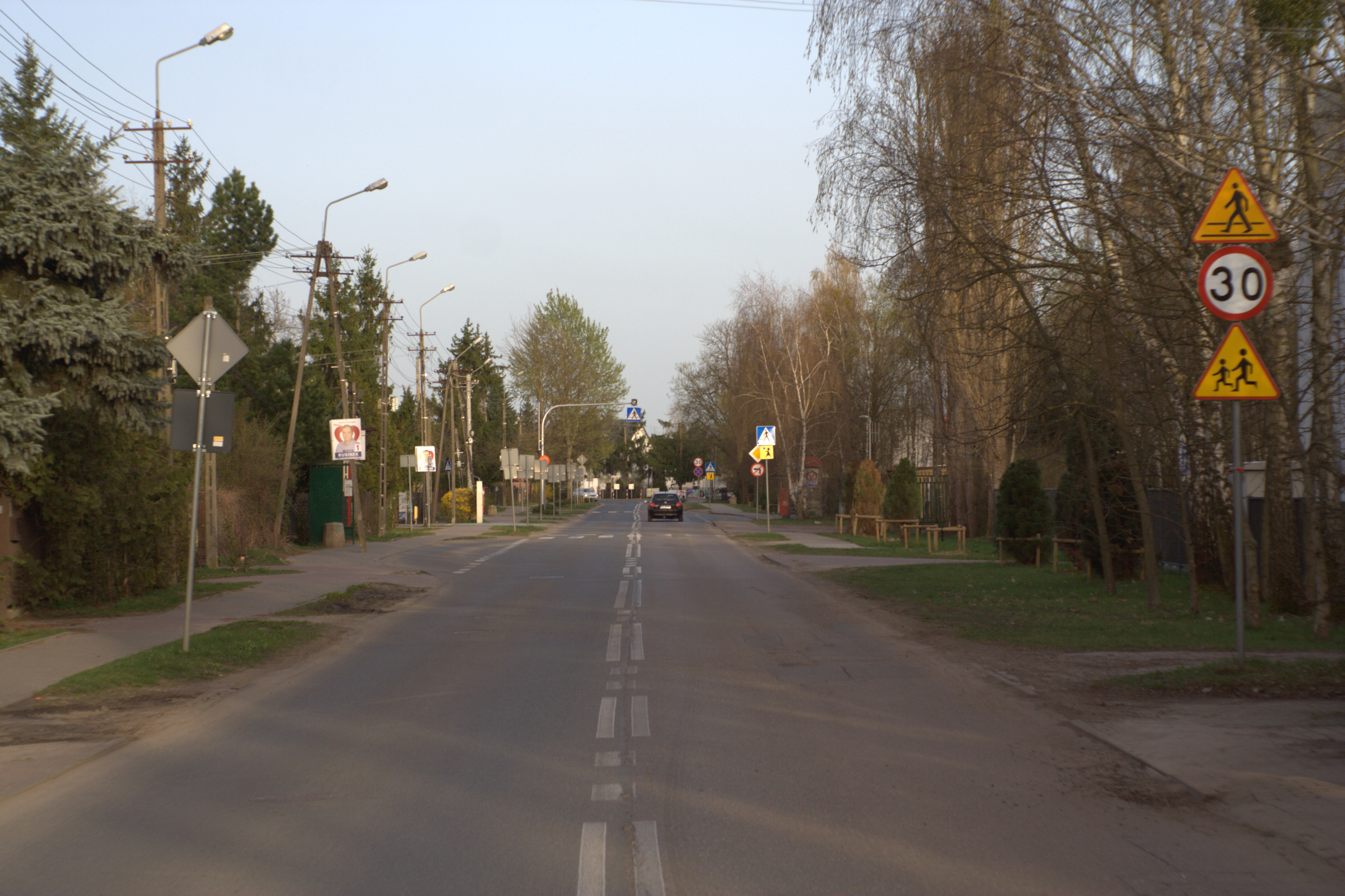
- The main street of Dziekanów Leśny, ul. Marii Konopnickiej

- Location within Poland
- Coordinates: 52°21′N 20°52′E
- Country: Poland
- Voivodeship: Masovian
- County: Warsaw West
- Gmina: Łomianki
- Population: 1,466

Dziekanów Leśny [d͡ʑɛˈkanuf ˈlɛɕnɨ] is a village in the administrative district of Gmina Łomianki, within Warsaw West County, Masovian Voivodeship, in east-central Poland.
