= Łomianki Dolne =

- Village
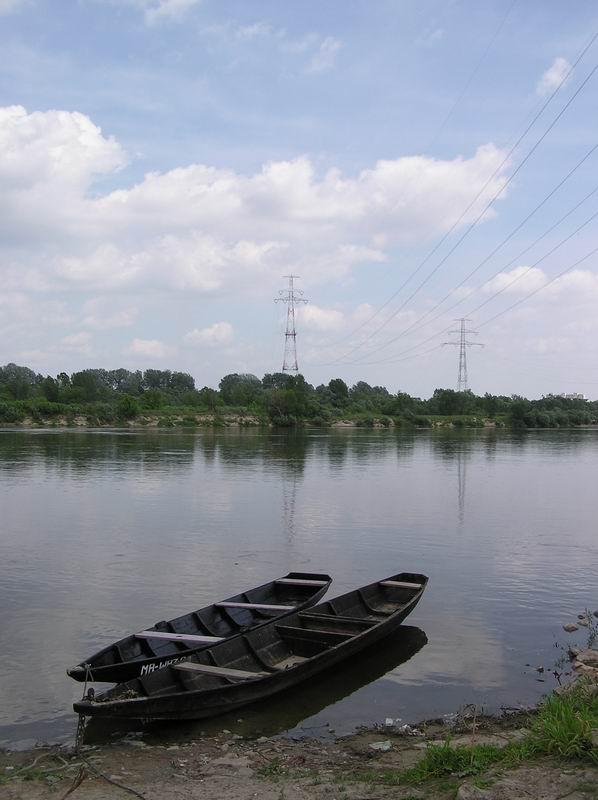
- Vistula River at Łomianki Dolne with a powerline crossing in the background

- Location within Poland
- Coordinates: 52°22′N 20°54′E
- Country: Poland
- Voivodeship: Masovian
- County: Warsaw West
- Gmina: Łomianki
- Population: 180
- Time zone: UTC+1 (CET)
  - Summer (DST): UTC+2 (CEST)
- Vehicle registration: WZ

Łomianki Dolne [wɔˈmjaŋki ˈdɔlnɛ] is a village in the administrative district of Gmina Łomianki, within Warsaw West County, Masovian Voivodeship, in east-central Poland.
