= Białuty =

Białuty may refer to the following places:

- Białuty, Sierpc County in Masovian Voivodeship (north-central Poland)
- Białuty, Warsaw West County in Masovian Voivodeship (east-central Poland)
- Białuty, Warmian-Masurian Voivodeship (north Poland)
