= Witanów railway station =

Railway station in Witanów, Poland

Witanów
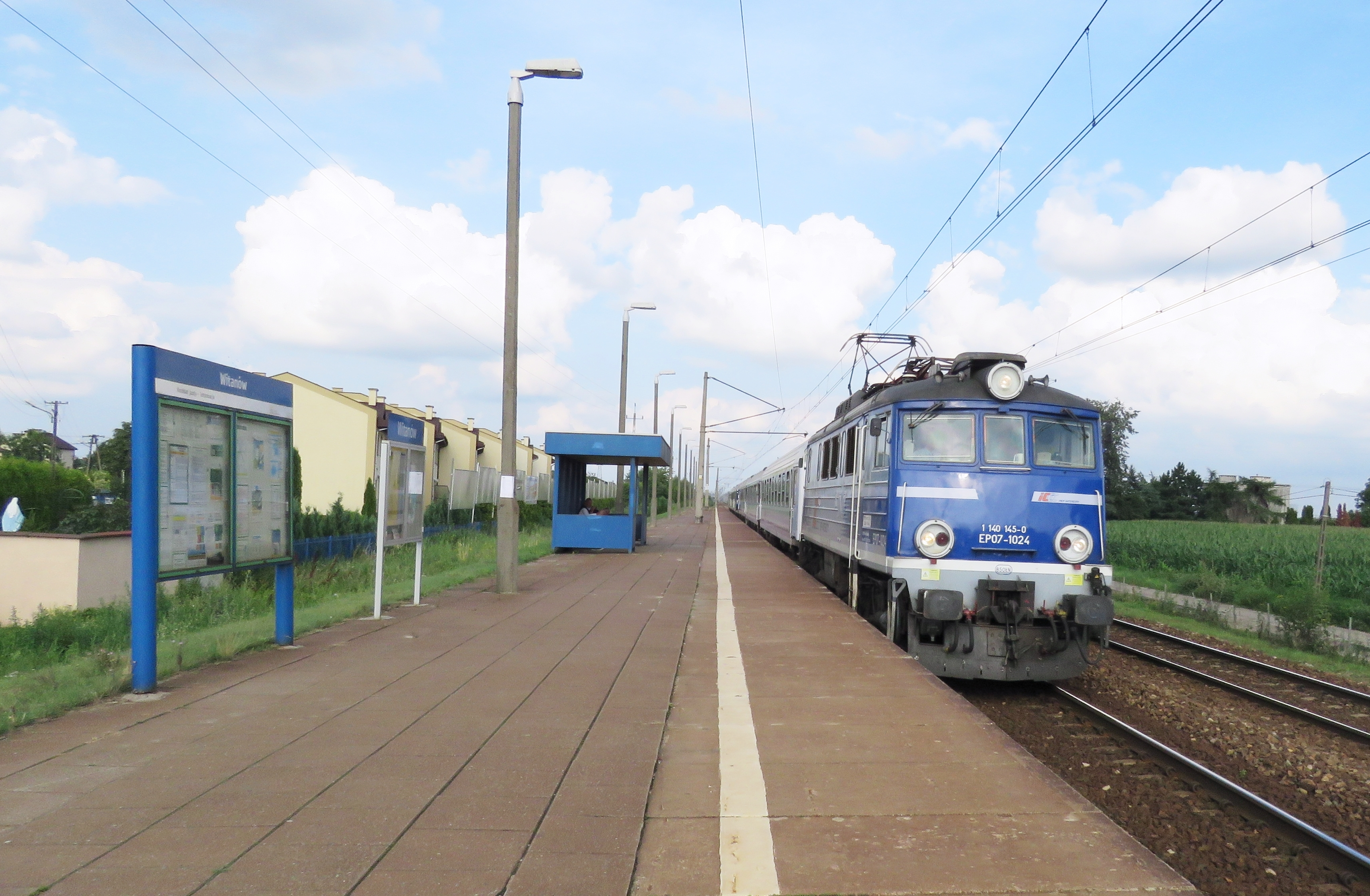

General information
- Location: Witanów, Masovian; Poland
- Coordinates: 52°11′09″N 20°34′31″E
- Owner: Polskie Koleje Państwowe S.A.
- Platforms: 2
- Tracks: 2

Services
Preceding station	Masovian Railways	Following station
Boża Wola towards Kutno	R3	Błonie towards Warszawa Wschodnia or Warszawa Główna
Location

Witanów railway station is a railway station in Witanów, Poland. The station is served by Masovian Railways, who run trains from Kutno to Warszawa Wschodnia.
