= Marysinek, Warsaw West County =

Marysinek
- Village
- Location within Poland
- Coordinates: 52°12′30″N 20°28′56″E
- Country: Poland
- Voivodeship: Masovian
- County: Warsaw West
- Gmina: Błonie
- Population: 64

Marysinek [marɨˈɕinɛk] is a village in the administrative district of Gmina Błonie, within Warsaw West County, Masovian Voivodeship, in east-central Poland.
