= Koczargi Nowe =

- Village
- Location within Poland
- Coordinates: 52°15′16″N 20°47′28″E
- Country: Poland
- Voivodeship: Masovian
- County: Warsaw West
- Gmina: Stare Babice
- Population (2012): 489

Koczargi Nowe [kɔˈt͡ʂarɡi ˈnɔvɛ] is a village in the administrative district of Gmina Stare Babice, within Warsaw West County, Masovian Voivodeship, in east-central Poland.
