= Borzęcin Mały =

- Village
- Location within Poland
- Coordinates: 52°14′N 20°43′E
- Country: Poland
- Voivodeship: Masovian
- County: Warsaw West
- Gmina: Stare Babice
- Population (2010): 351

Borzęcin Mały [bɔˈʐɛnt͡ɕin ˈmawɨ] is a village in the administrative district of Gmina Stare Babice, within Warsaw West County, Masovian Voivodeship, in east-central Poland.
