= Wola Łuszczewska =

- Village
- Location within Poland
- Coordinates: 52°12′47″N 20°31′13″E
- Country: Poland
- Voivodeship: Masovian
- County: Warsaw West
- Gmina: Błonie

Wola Łuszczewska [ˈvɔla wuʂˈt͡ʂɛfska] is a village in the administrative district of Gmina Błonie, within Warsaw West County, Masovian Voivodeship, in east-central Poland.
