= Błonie-Wieś =

- Village
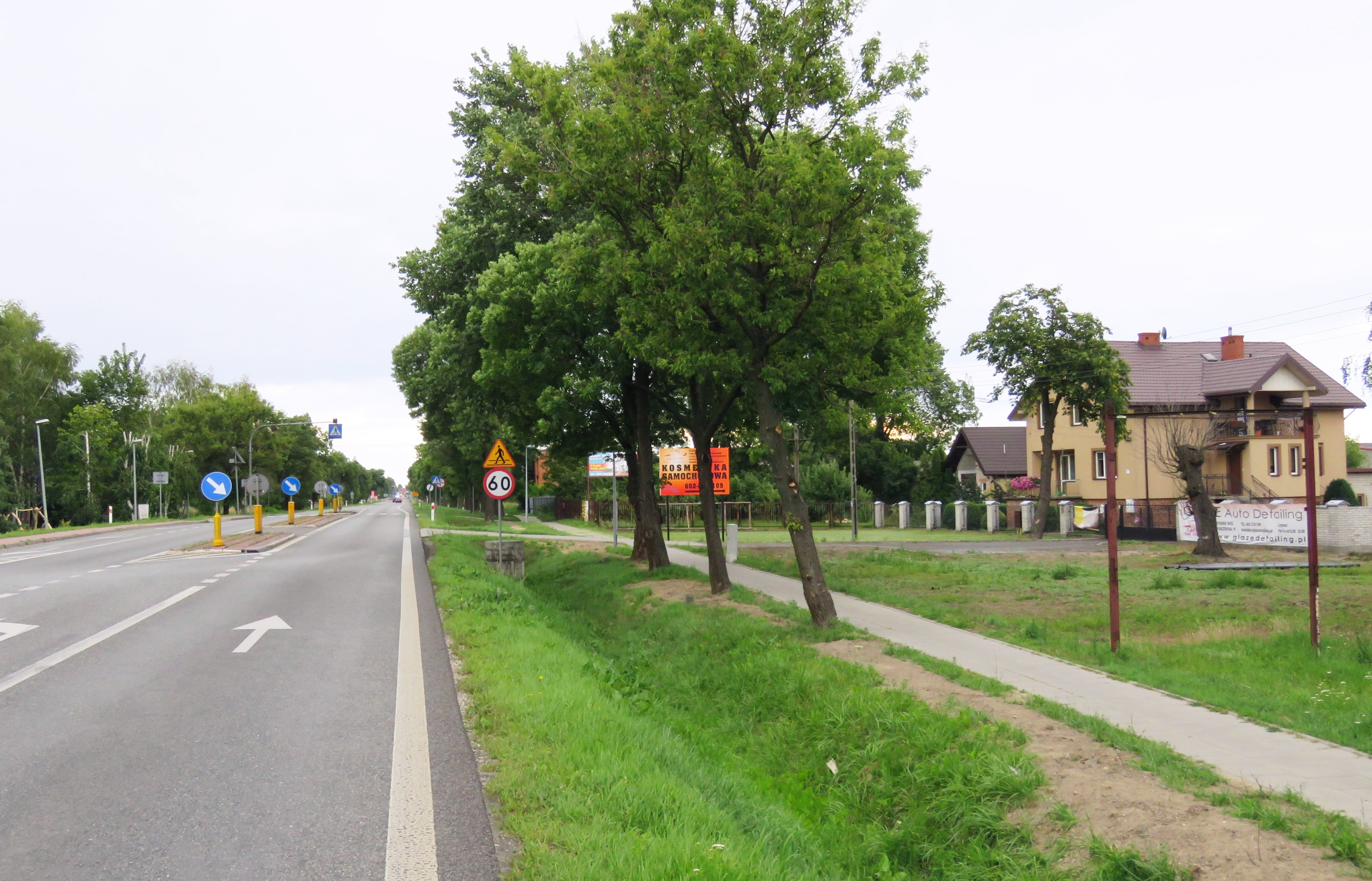

- Location within Poland
- Coordinates: 52°11′57″N 20°35′33″E
- Country: Poland
- Voivodeship: Masovian
- County: Warsaw West
- Gmina: Błonie

Błonie-Wieś [ˈbwɔɲɛ ˈvjɛɕ] is a village in the administrative district of Gmina Błonie, within Warsaw West County, Masovian Voivodeship, in east-central Poland.
