= Kępa Kiełpińska =

- Village
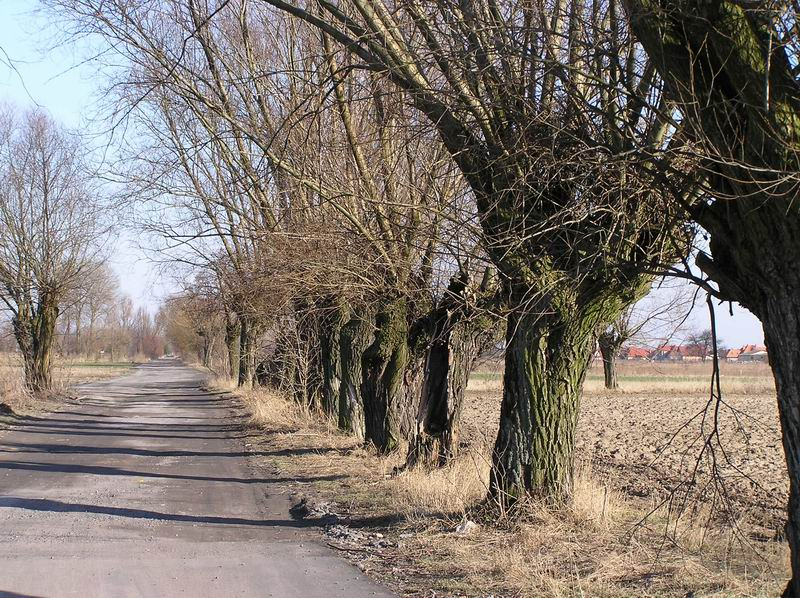
- Road between Kępa Kiełpińska and Kiełpin

- Location within Poland
- Coordinates: 52°22′N 20°52′E
- Country: Poland
- Voivodeship: Masovian
- County: Warsaw West
- Gmina: Łomianki
- Population: 70

Kępa Kiełpińska [ˈkɛmpa kʲɛu̯ˈpiɲska] (German Kielpiciener Kämpe) is a village in the administrative district of Gmina Łomianki, within Warsaw West County, Masovian Voivodeship, in east-central Poland. The village was founded and settled by Vistula Germans till 1945.
