= Cesinek =

- Village
- Location within Poland
- Coordinates: 52°13′07″N 20°34′33″E
- Country: Poland
- Voivodeship: Masovian
- County: Warsaw West
- Gmina: Błonie
- Population: 24

Cesinek [t͡sɛˈɕinɛk] is a village in the administrative district of Gmina Błonie, within Warsaw West County, Masovian Voivodeship, in east-central Poland.
