= Dziekanów Bajkowy =

- Village
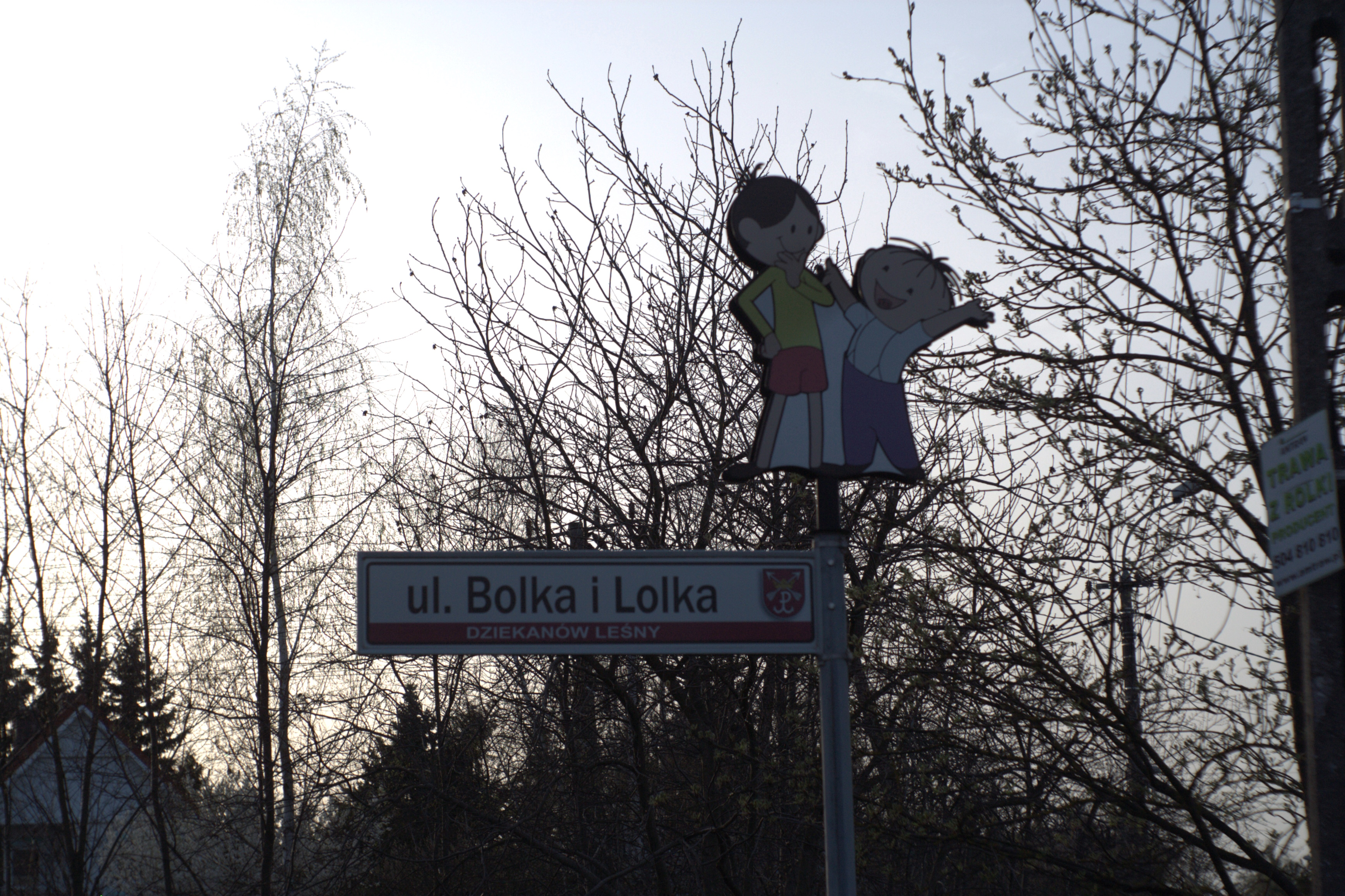
- Example of the themed street signs in Dziekanów Bajkowy, on ul. Bolka i Lolka

- Location within Poland
- Coordinates: 52°21′27″N 20°51′5″E
- Country: Poland
- Voivodeship: Masovian
- County: Warsaw West
- Gmina: Łomianki
- Population: 720

Dziekanów Bajkowy [d͡ʑɛˈkanuf bai̯ˈkɔvɨ] is a village in the administrative district of Gmina Łomianki, within Warsaw West County, Masovian Voivodeship, in east-central Poland.
