= Blizne Jasińskiego =

- Village
- Location within Poland
- Coordinates: 52°14′N 20°52′E
- Country: Poland
- Voivodeship: Masovian
- County: Warsaw West
- Gmina: Stare Babice
- Population (2010): 1,010

Blizne Jasińskiego [ˈbliznɛ jaɕiɲsˈkʲɛɡɔ] is a village in the administrative district of Gmina Stare Babice, within Warsaw West County, Masovian Voivodeship, in east-central Poland.
