= Kiełpin, Masovian Voivodeship =

Kiełpin
- Village
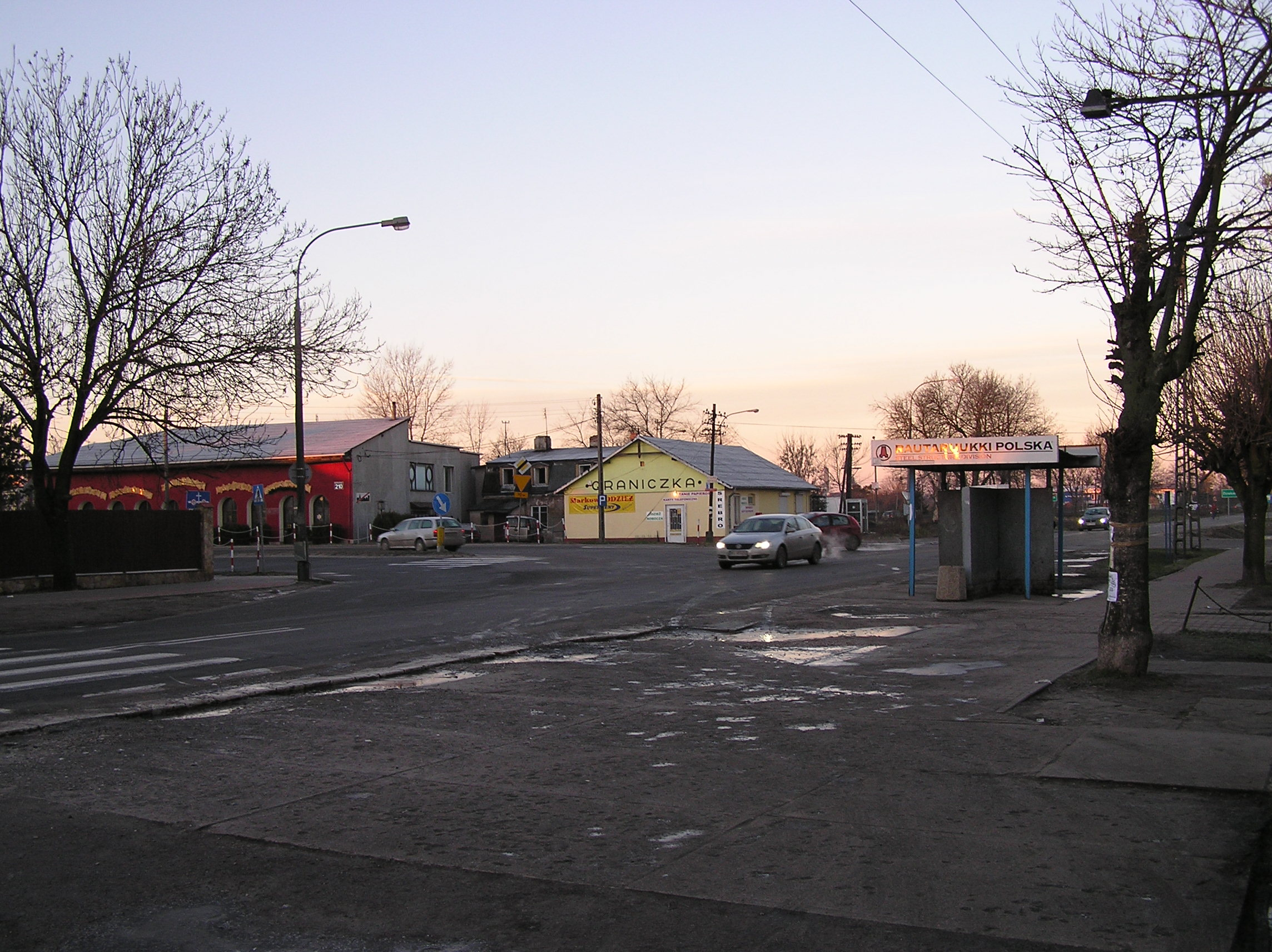
- Western part of Kiełpin village

- Location within Poland
- Coordinates: 52°20′53″N 20°51′54″E
- Country: Poland
- Voivodeship: Masovian
- County: Warsaw West
- Gmina: Łomianki
- Population: 1,381

Kiełpin [ˈkʲɛu̯pin] is a village in the administrative district of Gmina Łomianki, within Warsaw West County, Masovian Voivodeship, in east-central Poland.
