= Koczargi Stare =

- Village
- Location within Poland
- Coordinates: 52°15′56″N 20°47′43″E
- Country: Poland
- Voivodeship: Masovian
- County: Warsaw West
- Gmina: Stare Babice
- Population (2010): 879

Koczargi Stare [kɔˈt͡ʂarɡi ˈstarɛ] is a village in the administrative district of Gmina Stare Babice, within Warsaw West County, Masovian Voivodeship, in east-central Poland.
