= Rokitno, Masovian Voivodeship =

Rokitno
- Village
- Location within Poland
- Coordinates: 52°11′7″N 20°40′0″E
- Country: Poland
- Voivodeship: Masovian
- County: Warsaw West
- Gmina: Błonie
- Population: 130

Rokitno [rɔˈkitnɔ] is a village in the administrative district of Gmina Błonie, within Warsaw West County, Masovian Voivodeship, in east-central Poland.
