= Klaudyn =

- Village
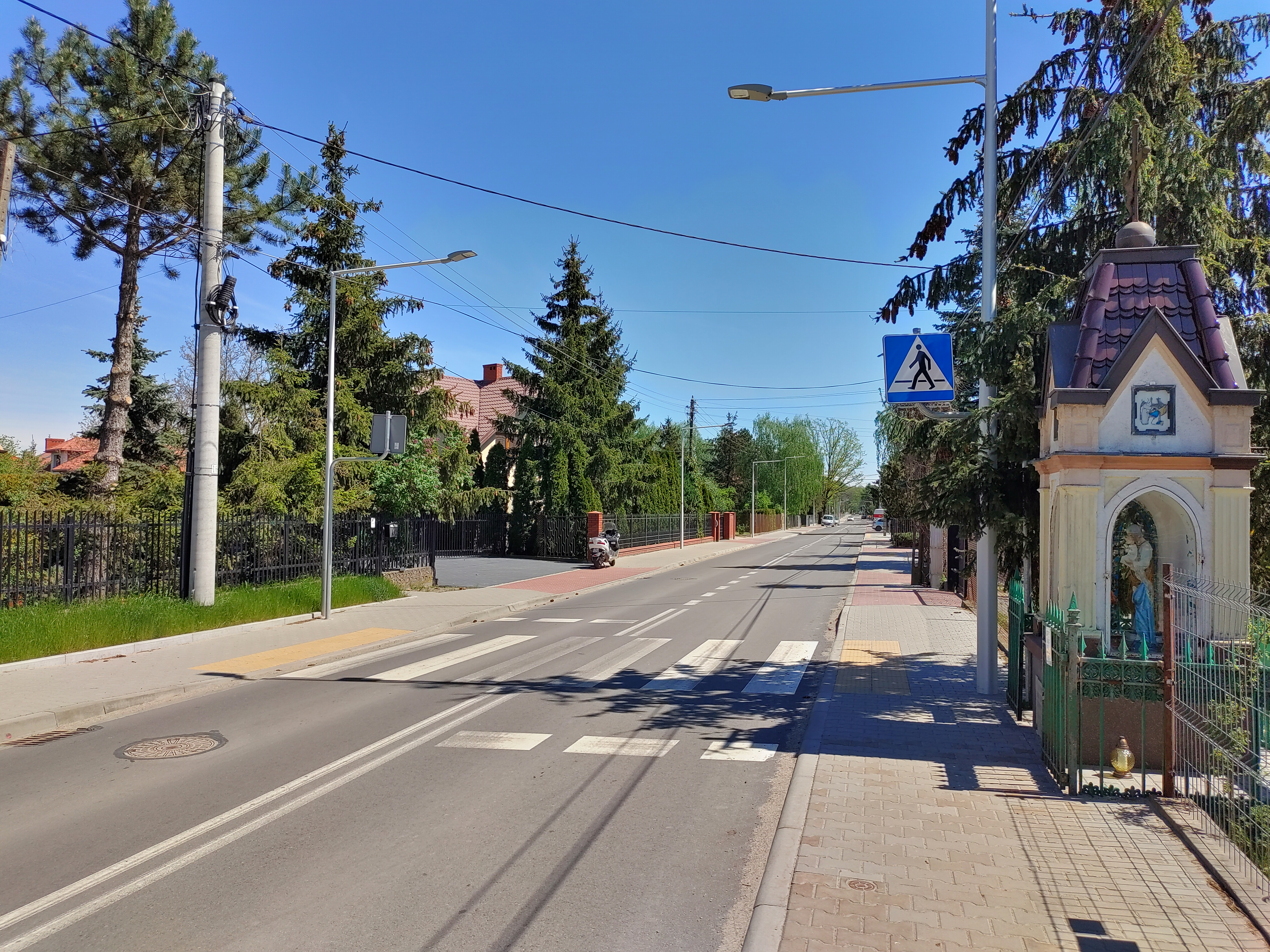

- Location within Poland
- Coordinates: 52°16′45″N 20°51′18″E
- Country: Poland
- Voivodeship: Masovian
- County: Warsaw West
- Gmina: Stare Babice

Population (2015)
  - Total: 1,565
- Time zone: UTC+1 (CET)
  - Summer (DST): UTC+2 (CEST)

Klaudyn (Polish pronunciation: [ˈklawdɨn]) is a village in the administrative district of Gmina Stare Babice, within Warsaw West County, Masovian Voivodeship, in east-central Poland.

Six Polish citizens were murdered by Nazi Germany in the village during World War II.
