= Zalesie, Warsaw West County =

Zalesie
- Village
- Location within Poland
- Coordinates: 52°16′N 20°46′E
- Country: Poland
- Voivodeship: Masovian
- County: Warsaw West
- Gmina: Stare Babice
- Population (2010): 176

Zalesie [zaˈlɛɕɛ] is a village in the administrative district of Gmina Stare Babice, within Warsaw West County, Masovian Voivodeship, in east-central Poland.
