= Sadowa, Masovian Voivodeship =

Sadowa
- Village
- Location within Poland
- Coordinates: 52°21′N 20°50′E
- Country: Poland
- Voivodeship: Masovian
- County: Warsaw West
- Gmina: Łomianki
- Population: 670

Sadowa [saˈdɔva] is a village in the administrative district of Gmina Łomianki, within Warsaw West County, Masovian Voivodeship, in east-central Poland.
