= Rochaliki =

- Village
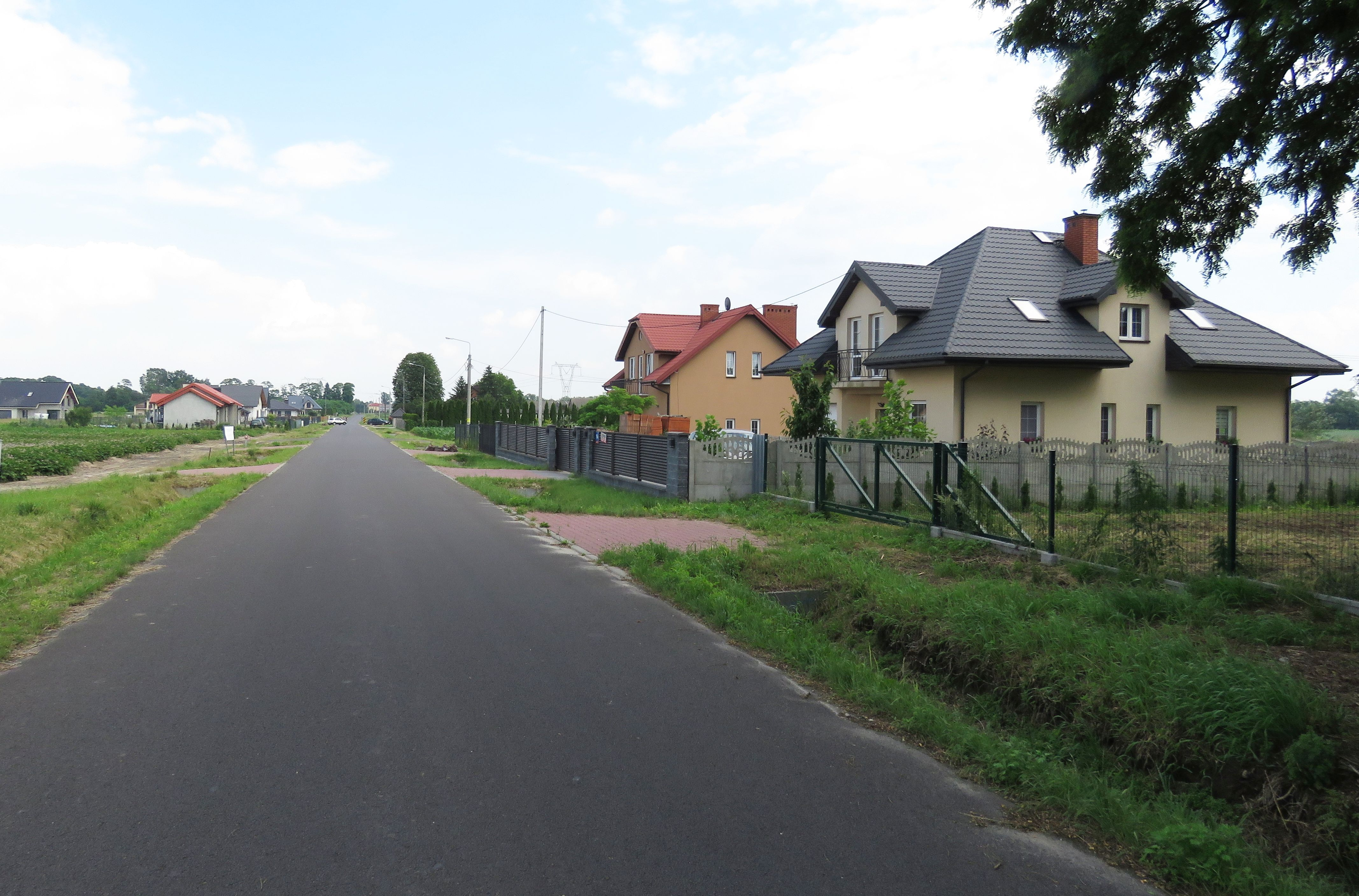

- Location within Poland
- Coordinates: 52°13′28″N 20°34′29″E
- Country: Poland
- Voivodeship: Masovian
- County: Warsaw West
- Gmina: Błonie

Rochaliki [rɔxaˈliki] is a village in the administrative district of Gmina Błonie, within Warsaw West County, Masovian Voivodeship, in east-central Poland.
