= Radzików, Masovian Voivodeship =

Radzików
- Village
- Location within Poland
- Coordinates: 52°13′39″N 20°36′57″E
- Country: Poland
- Voivodeship: Masovian
- County: Warsaw West
- Gmina: Błonie
- Population: 1,400

Radzików [raˈd͡ʑikuf] is a village in the administrative district of Gmina Błonie, within Warsaw West County, Masovian Voivodeship, in east-central Poland.
