= Bieniewo-Wieś =

- Village
- Location within Poland
- Coordinates: 52°11′20″N 20°29′26″E
- Country: Poland
- Voivodeship: Masovian
- County: Warsaw West
- Gmina: Błonie

Bieniewo-Wieś [bjɛˈɲɛvɔ ˈvjɛɕ] is a village in the administrative district of Gmina Błonie, within Warsaw West County, Masovian Voivodeship, in east-central Poland.
