= Odrzywół, Warsaw West County =

Odrzywół
- Village
- Location within Poland
- Coordinates: 52°11′46″N 20°31′55″E
- Country: Poland
- Voivodeship: Masovian
- County: Warsaw West
- Gmina: Błonie
- Population: 44

Odrzywół [ɔˈdʐɨvuu̯] is a village in the administrative district of Gmina Błonie, within Warsaw West County, Masovian Voivodeship, in east-central Poland.
