= Kwirynów =

- Village
- Location within Poland
- Coordinates: 52°15′N 20°51′E
- Country: Poland
- Voivodeship: Masovian
- County: Warsaw West
- Gmina: Stare Babice
- Population (2010): 832

Kwirynów [kfiˈrɨnuf] is a village in the administrative district of Gmina Stare Babice, within Warsaw West County, Masovian Voivodeship, in east-central Poland.
