= Battle of Buda Zaborowska =

1863 battle

- Part of January Uprising
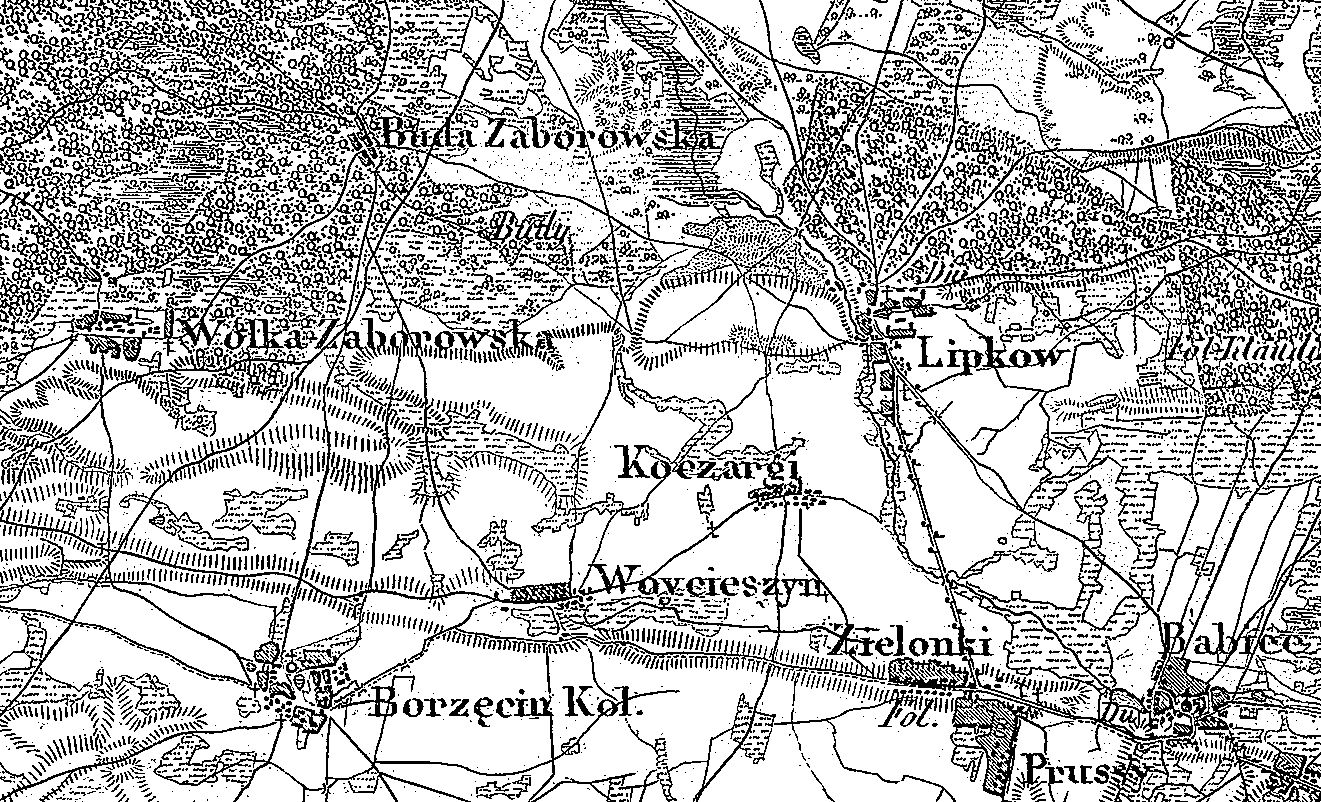
Date	14 April 1863
Location	Buda Zaborowska
Result	Russian victory

Belligerents
Polish National Government	Russia

Commanders and leaders
Major Walery Remiszewski	

Units involved
	670

Casualties and losses
72	

The Battle of Buda Zaborowska, one of many skirmishes of the January Uprising, took place on 14 April 1863 near the village of Buda Zaborowska in central part of Russian-controlled Congress Poland. Polish forces under Major Walery Remiszewski clashed with troops of the Imperial Russian Army. The battle resulted in Russian victory.

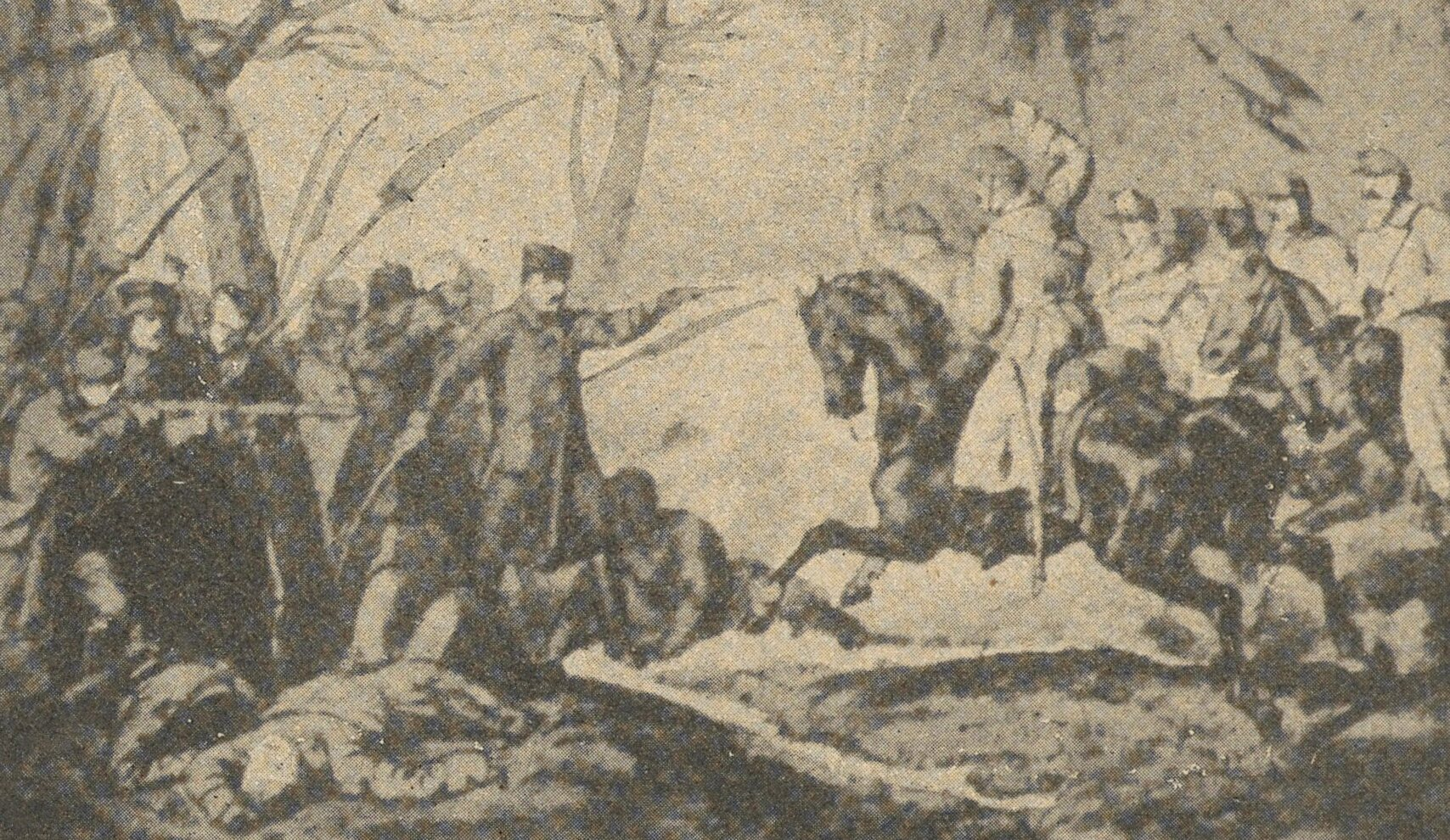
Bitwa pod Budą Zaborowską

In January 1863, a number of teenagers from Warsaw fled to the Kampinos Forest, in order to escape draft to the Russian Army. On 17 January Zygmunt Padlewski from Warsaw came to Kampinos, and in the following days, he organized a 1000-strong unit of teenagers, young men and local peasants, some of whom were armed only with sticks. On 19 January most rebels left the forest, heading towards Płock. Still, a number stayed in Kampinos, also more men came to the forest from Warsaw. They were commanded by Aleksander Rogalinski.

On the night of 11–12 April, two prisoners of Warsaw Citadel decided to escape, hoping that their guards would be drunk, celebrating Orthodox Easter. Before their escape, Jaroslaw Dabrowski and Bronislaw Szwarce had asked for armed support from the Kampinos Forest, so on 12 April 1863, in the woods near the village of Zaborow, some 250 men were concentrated under the command of Major Walery Remiszewski. The insurgents marched towards the Citadel, but the Russians were aware of their presence. On 13 April Russian troops blocked roads towards Warsaw, and on the next day, the Russians attacked the insurgents. Enjoying numerical superiority and being better armed, the 670-strong Russian unit destroyed the Polish party, killing 30 men (including Remiszewski). Furthermore, the Cossacks murdered injured insurgents, and the total number of Polish losses was at least 72 killed and 9 injured.

After the battle, 72 (or 76) Poles were buried in a mass grave in Zaborow Lesny. Since 14 April 2012 the Raid of January Uprising remembrance takes place in the area.

== Sources ==
- Stefan Kieniewicz: Powstanie styczniowe. Warsaw: Państwowe Wydawnictwo Naukowe, 1983. ISBN 83-01-03652-4.
- Stanisław Zieliński: Bitwy i potyczki 1863–1864, Rapperswil 1913
