= Radonice =

Radonice may refer to places:

== Czech Republic ==
- Radonice (Chomutov District), a municipality and village in the Ústí nad Labem Region
- Radonice (Prague-East District), a municipality and village in the Central Bohemian Region
- Radonice, a village and part of Divišov in the Central Bohemian Region
- Radonice, a village and part of Dolní Bukovsko in the South Bohemian Region
- Radonice, a village and part of Milavče in the Plzeň Region
- Radonice nad Ohří, a village and part of Peruc in the Ústí nad Labem Region

== Poland ==
- Radonice, Poland, a village in Masovian Voivodeship
