= Dziekanów Nowy =

- Village
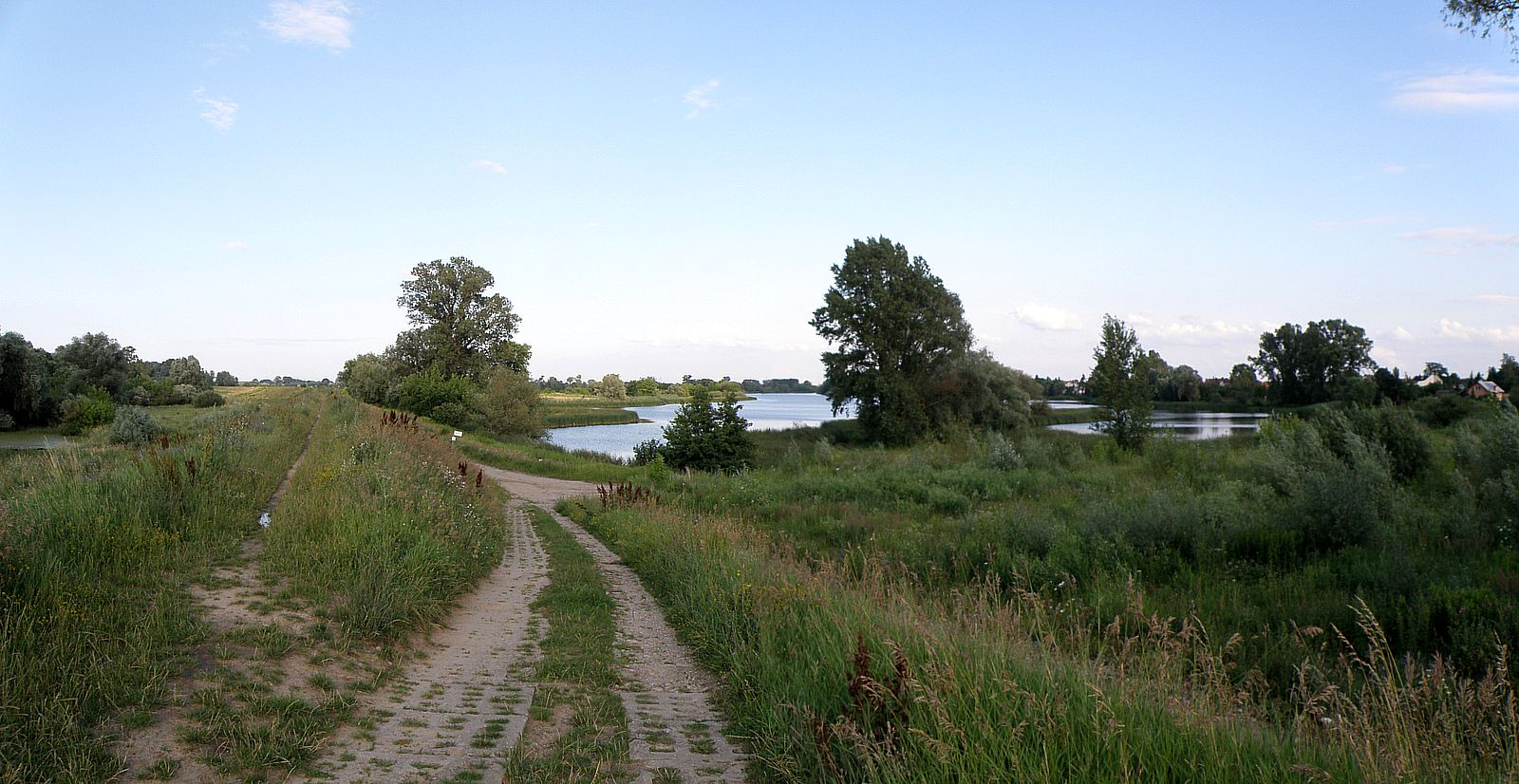
- Jezioro Dziekanowskie near Vistula river

- Location within Poland
- Coordinates: 52°21′57″N 20°49′6″E
- Country: Poland
- Voivodeship: Masovian
- County: Warsaw West
- Gmina: Łomianki
- Elevation: 74 m (243 ft)
- Population: 312

Dziekanów Nowy [d͡ʑɛˈkanuf ˈnɔvɨ] is a village in the administrative district of Gmina Łomianki, within Warsaw West County, Masovian Voivodeship, in east-central Poland.
