= Zielonki-Wieś =

- Village
- Location within Poland
- Coordinates: 52°15′10″N 20°48′42″E
- Country: Poland
- Voivodeship: Masovian
- County: Warsaw West
- Gmina: Stare Babice
- Population (2010): 573

Zielonki-Wieś [ʑɛˈlɔŋki ˈvjɛɕ] is a village in the administrative district of Gmina Stare Babice, within Warsaw West County, Masovian Voivodeship, in east-central Poland.
