= Górna Wieś, Masovian Voivodeship =

Górna Wieś
- Village
- Location within Poland
- Coordinates: 52°13′N 20°32′E
- Country: Poland
- Voivodeship: Masovian
- County: Warsaw West
- Gmina: Błonie

Górna Wieś [ˈɡurna ˈvjɛɕ] is a village in the administrative district of Gmina Błonie, within Warsaw West County, Masovian Voivodeship, in east-central Poland.
