= Łomianki Chopina =

- Village
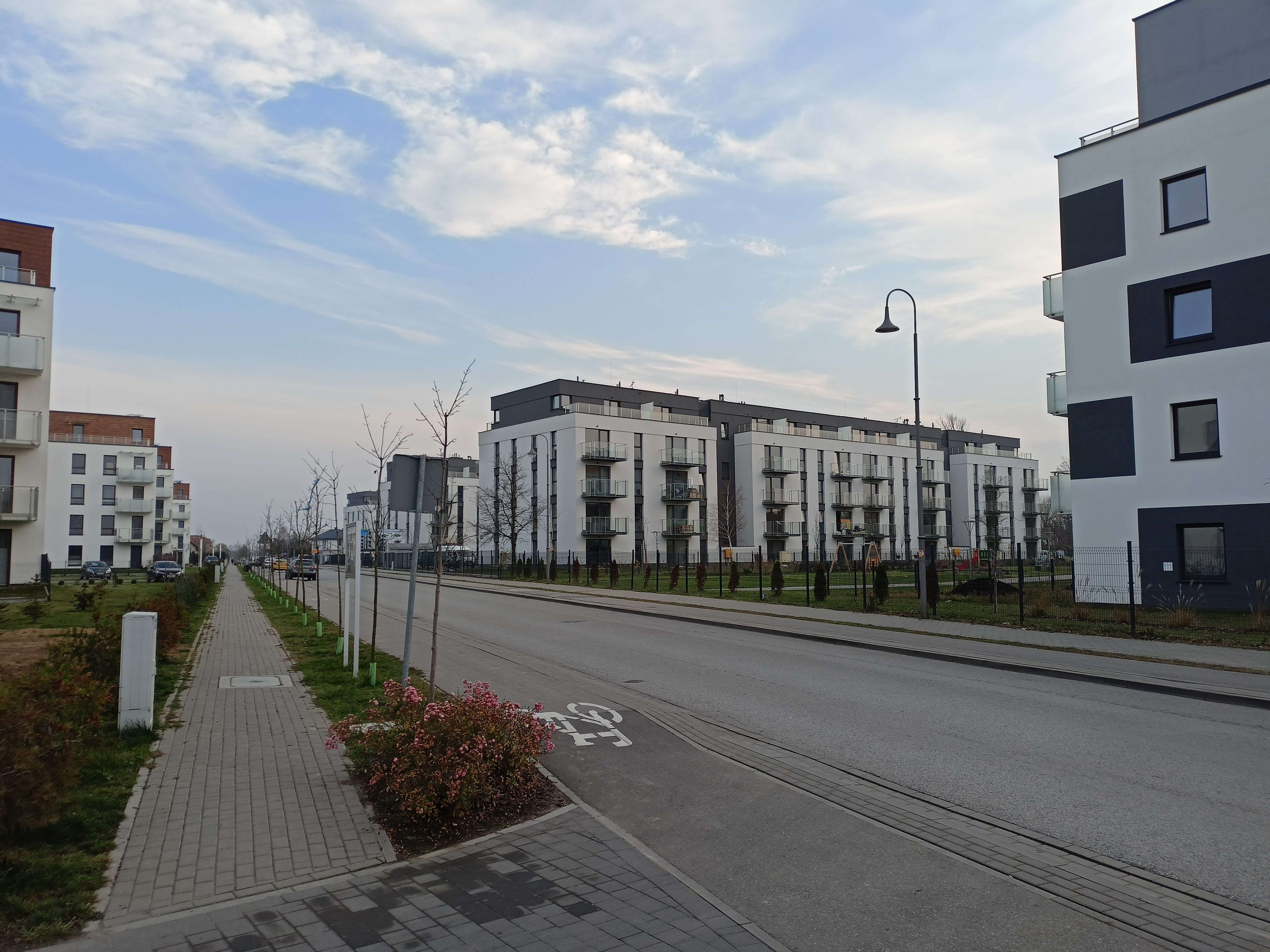
- Aleja Fryderyka Chopina, the main road of the village

- Location within Poland
- Coordinates: 52°20′55″N 20°53′21″E
- Country: Poland
- Voivodeship: Masovian
- County: Warsaw West
- Gmina: Łomianki
- Population: 460

Łomianki Chopina [wɔˈmjaŋki ʂɔˈpɛna] is a village in the administrative district of Gmina Łomianki, within Warsaw West County, Masovian Voivodeship, in east-central Poland.
