= Piorunów, Masovian Voivodeship =

Piorunów
- Village
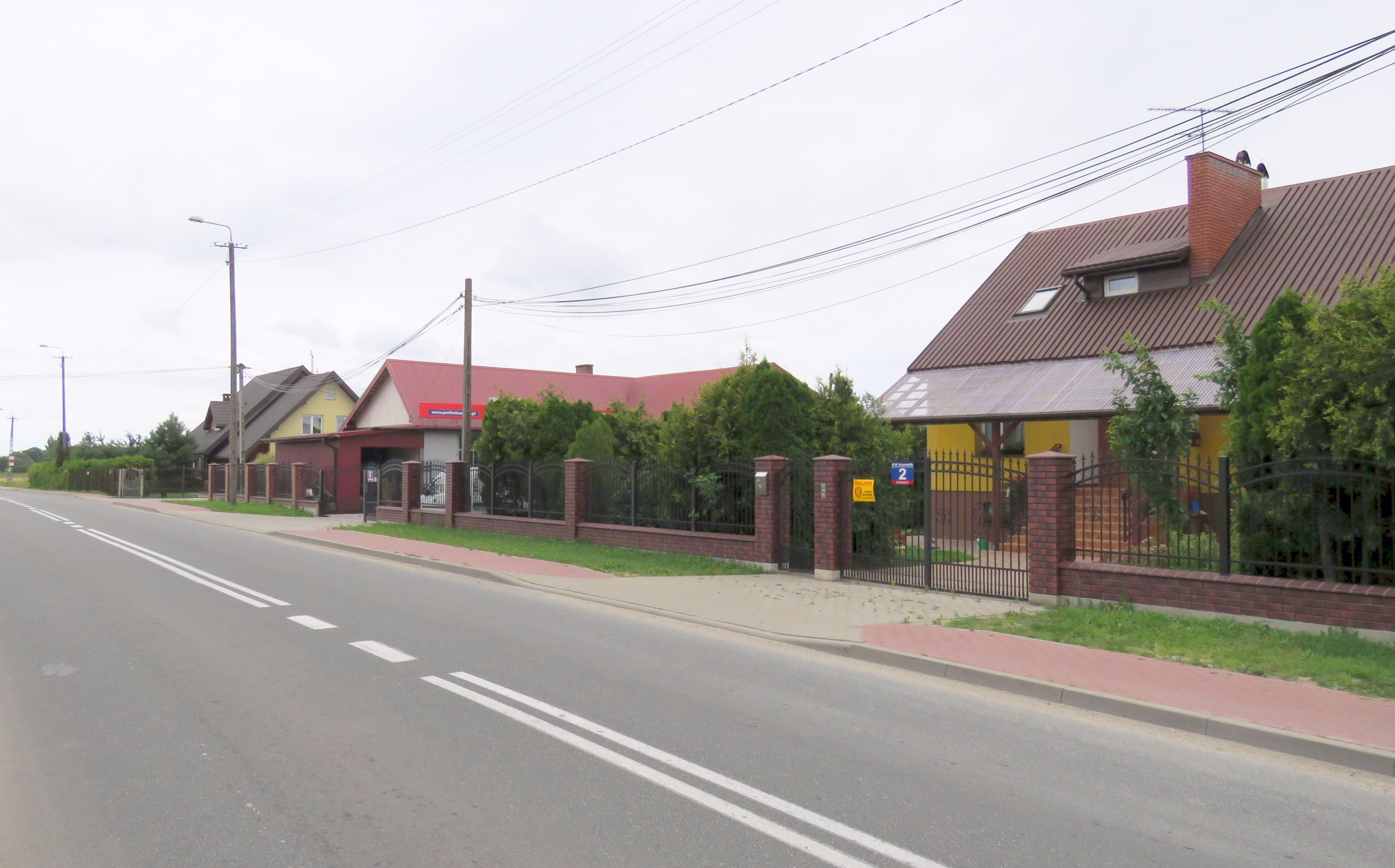

- Location within Poland
- Coordinates: 52°12′1″N 20°34′17″E
- Country: Poland
- Voivodeship: Masovian
- County: Warsaw West
- Gmina: Błonie
- Population: 107

Piorunów [pjɔˈrunuf] is a village in the administrative district of Gmina Błonie, within Warsaw West County, Masovian Voivodeship, in east-central Poland.
