= Stanisławów, Warsaw West County =

Stanisławów
- Village
- Location within Poland
- Coordinates: 52°16′48″N 20°44′58″E
- Country: Poland
- Voivodeship: Masovian
- County: Warsaw West
- Gmina: Stare Babice
- Population (2010): 137

Stanisławów [staniˈswavuf] is a village in the administrative district of Gmina Stare Babice, within Warsaw West County, Masovian Voivodeship, in east-central Poland.
