= Buda, Masovian Voivodeship =

Buda
- Village
- Location within Poland
- Coordinates: 52°17′40″N 20°44′29″E
- Country: Poland
- Voivodeship: Masovian
- County: Warsaw West
- Gmina: Stare Babice
- Population (2010): 28

Buda [ˈbuda] is a village in the administrative district of Gmina Stare Babice, within Warsaw West County, Masovian Voivodeship, in east-central Poland.
