= Radonice, Poland =

Radonice
- Village
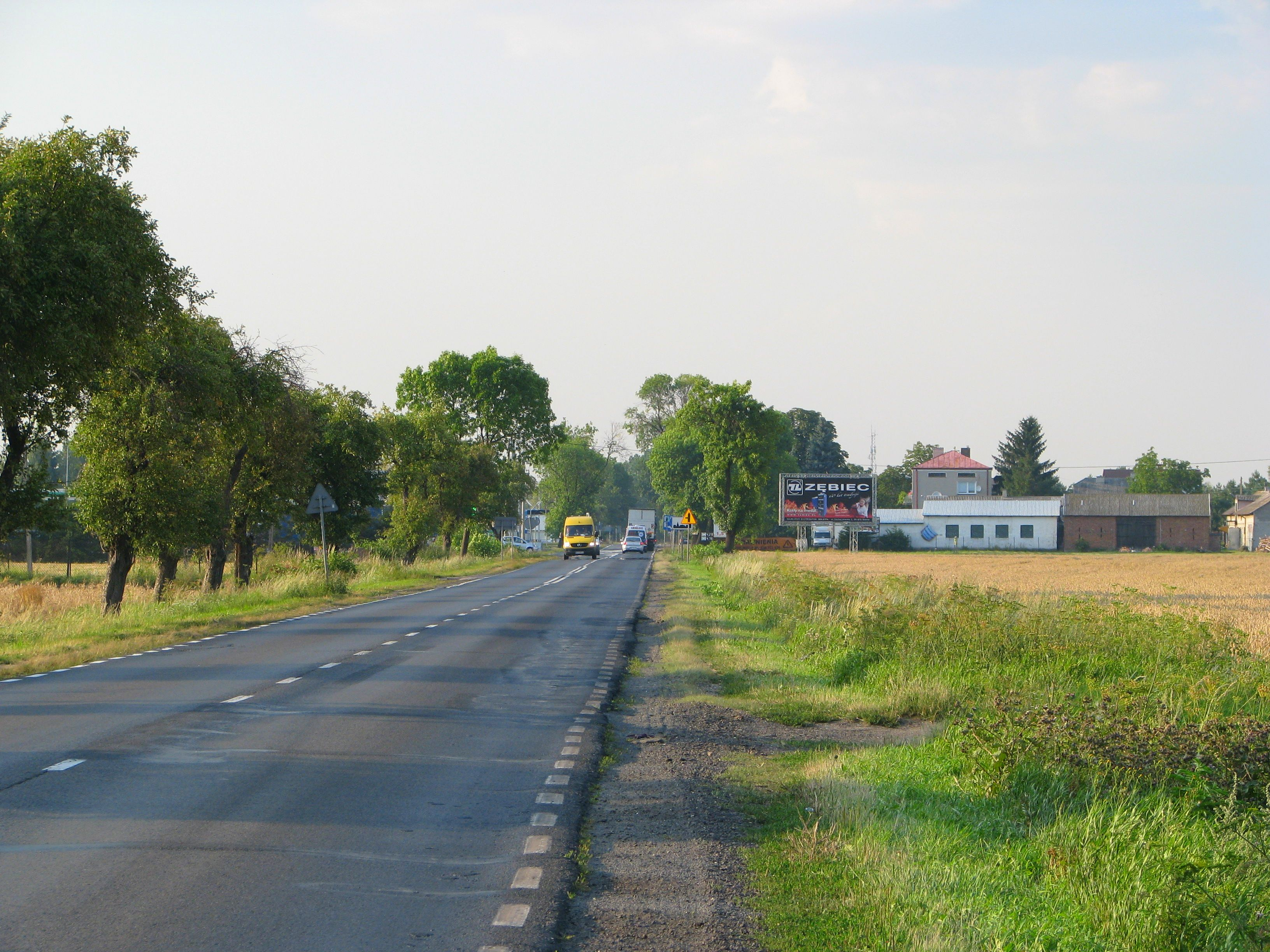

- Location within Poland
- Coordinates: 52°10′N 20°36′E
- Country: Poland
- Voivodeship: Masovian
- County: Warsaw West
- Gmina: Błonie

Radonice [radɔˈnit͡sɛ] is a village in the administrative district of Gmina Błonie, within Warsaw West County, Masovian Voivodeship, in east-central Poland.
