= Gmina Łomianki =

Gmina Łomianki Łomianki Commune
- Gmina
- Flag Coat of arms
- Interactive map of Gmina Łomianki
- Coordinates (Łomianki): 52°20′N 20°53′E
- Country: Poland
- Voivodeship: Masovian
- County: Warsaw West
- Seat: Łomianki

Area
  - Total: 38.06 km^{2} (14.70 sq mi)

Population (2013)
  - Total: 25,013
  - Density: 657.2/km^{2} (1,702/sq mi)
  - Urban: 16,639
  - Rural: 8,374
- Time zone: UTC+1 (CET)
  - Summer (DST): UTC+2 (CEST)
- Website: http://www.lomianki.pl

Gmina Łomianki is an urban-rural gmina (administrative district) in Warsaw West County, Masovian Voivodeship, in east-central Poland. Its seat is the town of Łomianki, which lies approximately 15 kilometres (9 mi) north-east of Ożarów Mazowiecki and 16 km (10 mi) north-west of Warsaw.

It covers an area of 38.06 square kilometres (14.7 sq mi), and as of 2008 its total population is 23,155.

== Villages ==
Apart from the town of Łomianki, Gmina Łomianki contains the villages and settlements of Dziekanów Bajkowy, Dziekanów Leśny, Dziekanów Nowy, Dziekanów Polski, Kępa Kiełpińska, Kiełpin, Łomianki Chopina, Łomianki Dolne and Sadowa.

== Neighbouring gminas ==
Gmina Łomianki is bordered by the city of Warsaw and by the gminas of Czosnów, Izabelin and Jabłonna.
