= Bieniewice =

- Village
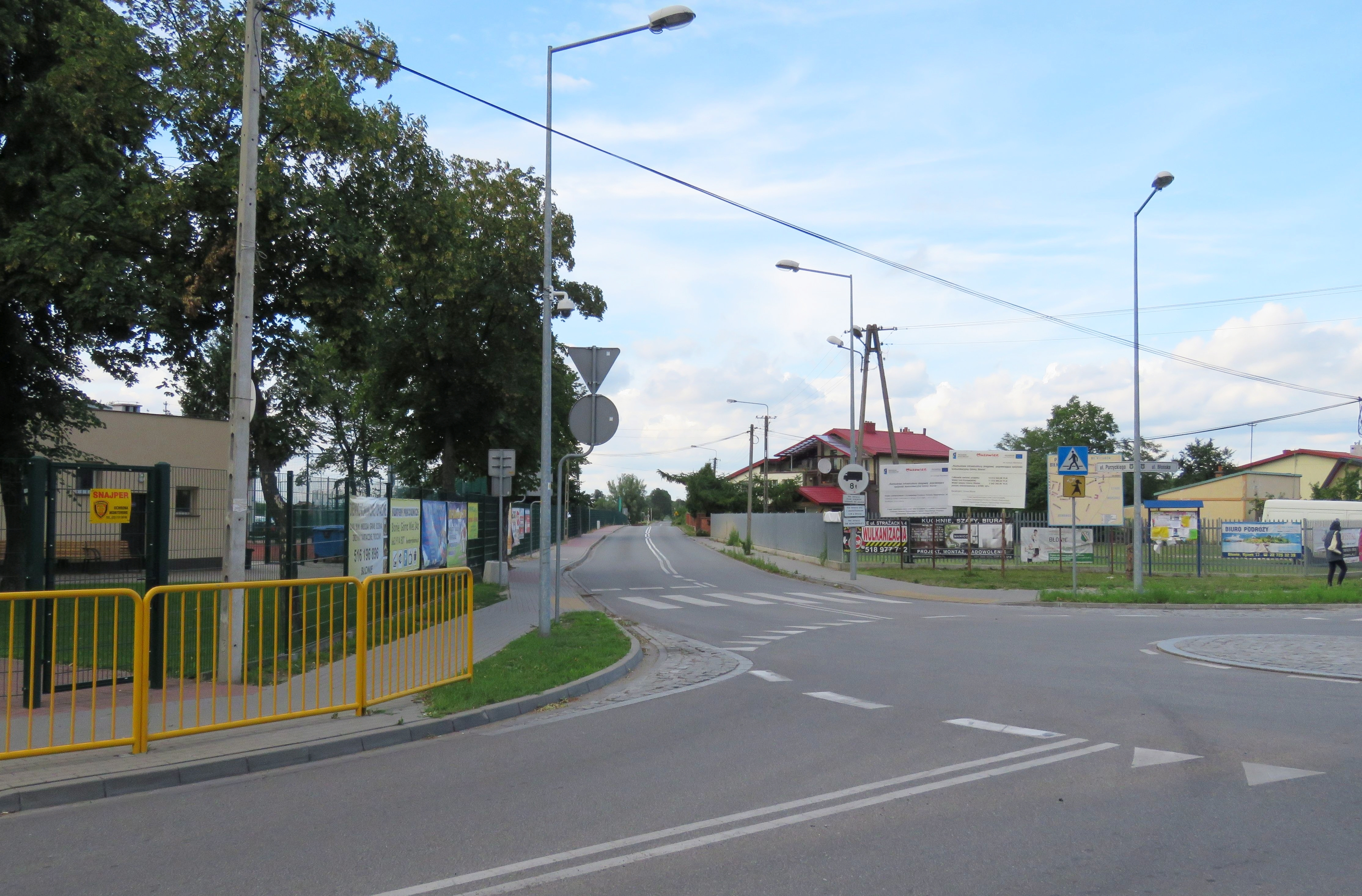

- Location within Poland
- Coordinates: 52°11′N 20°33′E
- Country: Poland
- Voivodeship: Masovian
- County: Warsaw West
- Gmina: Błonie
- Population: 660

Bieniewice [bjɛɲɛˈvit͡sɛ] is a village in the administrative district of Gmina Błonie, within Warsaw West County, Masovian Voivodeship, in east-central Poland.
