= Boża Wola railway station =

Railway station in Grodzisk Mazowiecki County, Poland

Boża Wola
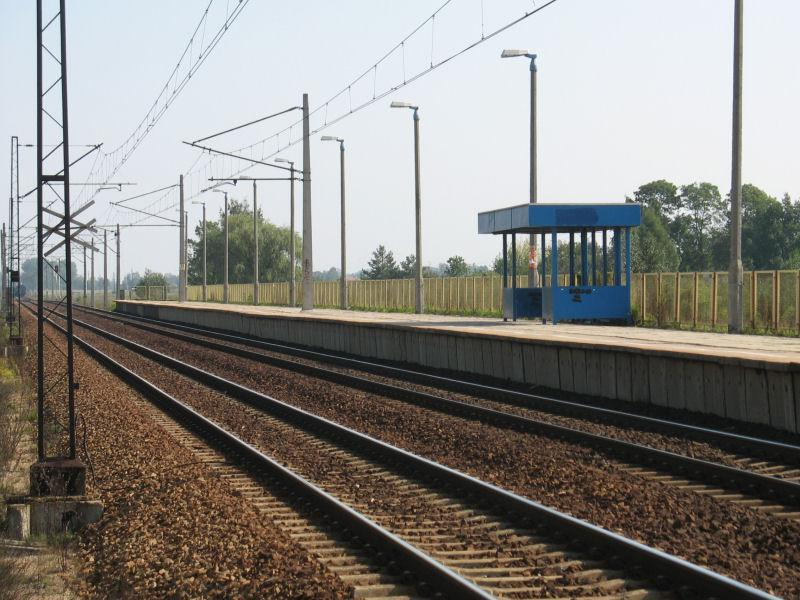

General information
- Location: Boża Wola, Grodzisk County, Masovian Voivodeship; Poland
- Coordinates: 52°11′22″N 20°31′42″E
- Owner: Polish State Railways
- Platforms: 2
- Tracks: 2

History
- Opened: 1902

Services
| Preceding station | Masovian Railways | Following station |
|---|---|---|
| Seroki towards Kutno | R3 | Witanów towards Warszawa Wschodnia or Warszawa Główna |
Location

Boża Wola is a railway station in Boża Wola, Grodzisk County, in eastern Poland. The station is served by Masovian Railways, who run trains from Kutno to Warszawa Wschodnia.
