= Witanów =

- Village
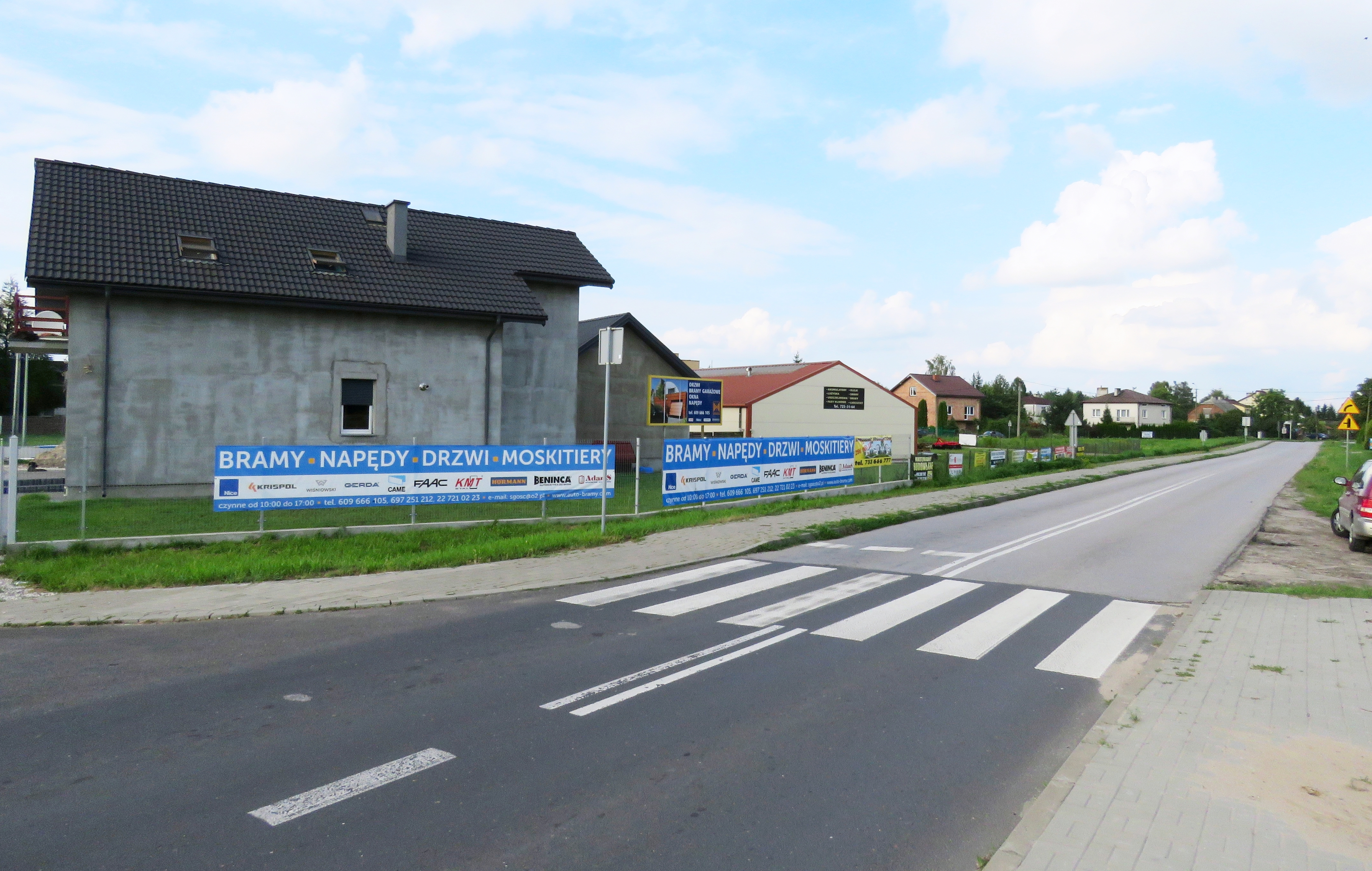

- Location within Poland
- Coordinates: 52°11′20″N 20°34′23″E
- Country: Poland
- Voivodeship: Masovian
- County: Warsaw West
- Gmina: Błonie
- Population: 153

Witanów [viˈtanuf] is a village in the administrative district of Gmina Błonie, within Warsaw West County, Masovian Voivodeship, in east-central Poland.
