= Wawrzyszew, Warsaw West County =

Wawrzyszew
- Village
- Location within Poland
- Coordinates: 52°12′59″N 20°35′13″E
- Country: Poland
- Voivodeship: Masovian
- County: Warsaw West
- Gmina: Błonie

Wawrzyszew [vaˈvʐɨʂɛf] is a village in the administrative district of Gmina Błonie, within Warsaw West County, Masovian Voivodeship, in east-central Poland.
