= Stare Babice =

- Village
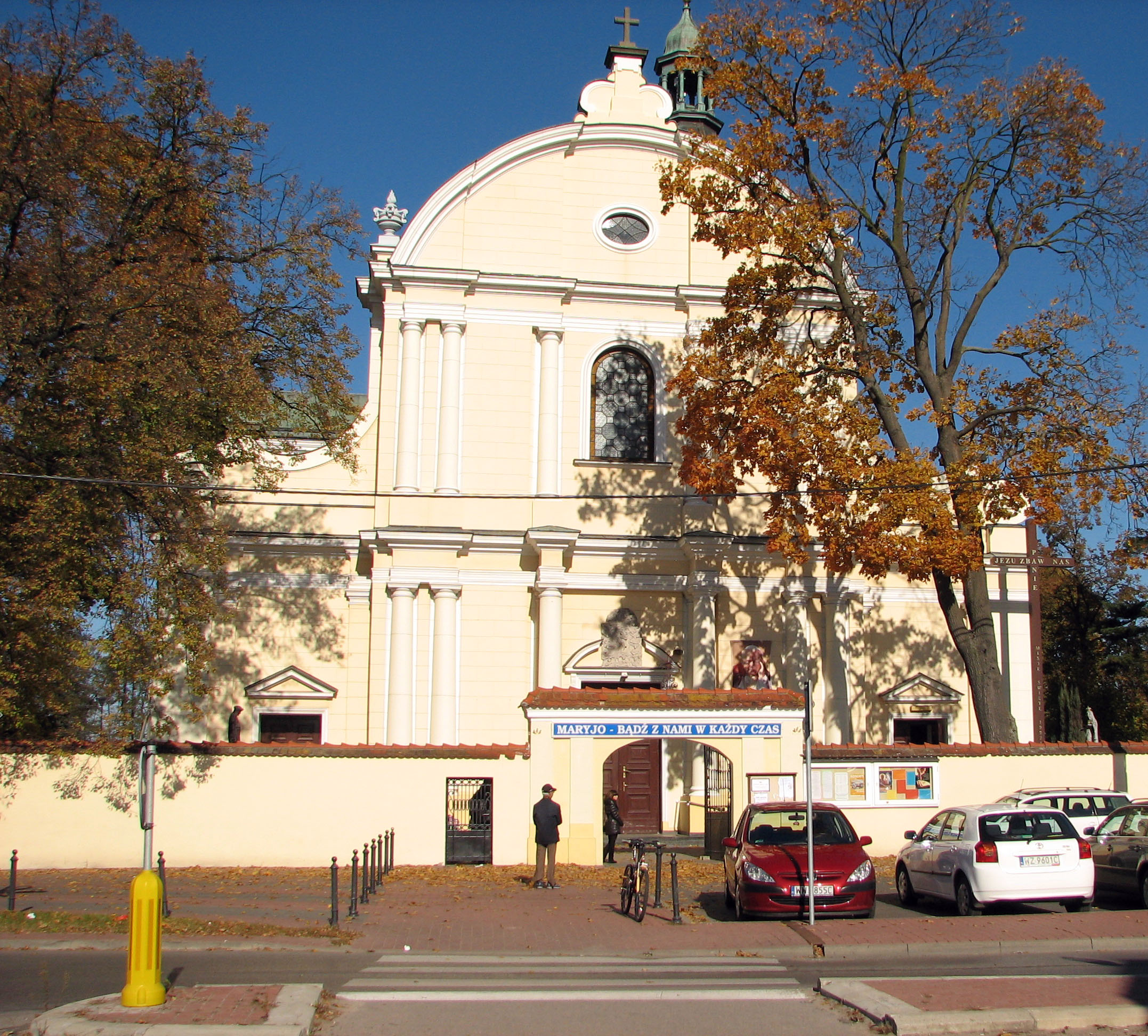
- Parish church in Stare Babice

- Coat of arms

- Location within Poland
- Coordinates: 52°15′N 20°51′E
- Country: Poland
- Voivodeship: Masovian
- County: Warsaw West
- Gmina: Stare Babice
- Population (2010): 2,056

Stare Babice (pronounced [ˈstarɛ baˈbit͡sɛ]; "the Old Babice") is a village in Warsaw West County, Masovian Voivodeship, in east-central Poland. It is the seat of the gmina (administrative district) called Gmina Stare Babice.

== World War II history ==
During occupation of Poland in World War II, Babice served as location of mass executions of Jews from the Warsaw Ghetto nearby. In 1942, 110 Jews from the Gęsiówka Prison in Warsaw were murdered by the Germans in a single Babice massacre (pl).
