= Kopytów, Masovian Voivodeship =

Kopytów
- Village
- Location within Poland
- Coordinates: 52°12′26″N 20°39′56″E
- Country: Poland
- Voivodeship: Masovian
- County: Warsaw West
- Gmina: Błonie
- Population: 260

Kopytów [kɔˈpɨtuf] is a village in the administrative district of Gmina Błonie, within Warsaw West County, Masovian Voivodeship, in east-central Poland.
