= Gmina Stare Babice =

Gmina Stare Babice Stare Babice Commune
- Gmina
- Flag Coat of arms
- Interactive map of Gmina Stare Babice
- Coordinates (Stare Babice): 52°15′N 20°51′E
- Country: Poland
- Voivodeship: Masovian
- County: Warsaw West
- Seat: Stare Babice

Area
  - Total: 63.49 km^{2} (24.51 sq mi)

Population (2013)
  - Total: 17,593
  - Density: 277.1/km^{2} (717.7/sq mi)
- Website: http://www.stare-babice.pl/

Gmina Stare Babice is a rural gmina (administrative district) in Warsaw West County, Masovian Voivodeship, in east-central Poland. Its seat is the village of Stare Babice, which lies approximately 6 kilometres (4 mi) north-east of Ożarów Mazowiecki and 11 km (7 mi) west of Warsaw.

The gmina covers an area of 63.49 square kilometres (24.5 sq mi), and as of 2006 its total population is 15,391 (17,593 in 2013).

== Villages ==
Gmina Stare Babice contains the villages and settlements of Babice Nowe, Blizne Jasińskiego, Blizne Łaszczyńskiego, Borzęcin Duży, Borzęcin Mały, Buda, Janów, Klaudyn, Koczargi Nowe, Koczargi Stare, Kwirynów, Latchorzew, Lipków, Lubiczów, Mariew, Stanisławów, Stare Babice, Topolin, Wierzbin, Wojcieszyn, Zalesie, Zielonki-Parcela and Zielonki-Wieś.

== Neighbouring gminas ==
Gmina Stare Babice is bordered by the city of Warsaw and by the gminas of Izabelin, Leszno and Ożarów Mazowiecki.
