= Boża Wola, Grodzisk County =

Boża Wola
- Village
- Location within Poland
- Coordinates: 52°10′N 20°31′E
- Country: Poland
- Voivodeship: Masovian
- County: Grodzisk
- Gmina: Baranów

Population
  - Total: 690
- Time zone: UTC+1 (CET)
  - Summer (DST): UTC+2 (CEST)

Boża Wola [ˈbɔʐa ˈvɔla] is a village in the administrative district of Gmina Baranów, within Grodzisk County, Masovian Voivodeship, in east-central Poland.

Nine Polish citizens were murdered by Nazi Germany in the village during World War II.
