= Gmina Błonie =

Gmina Błonie Błonie Commune
- Gmina
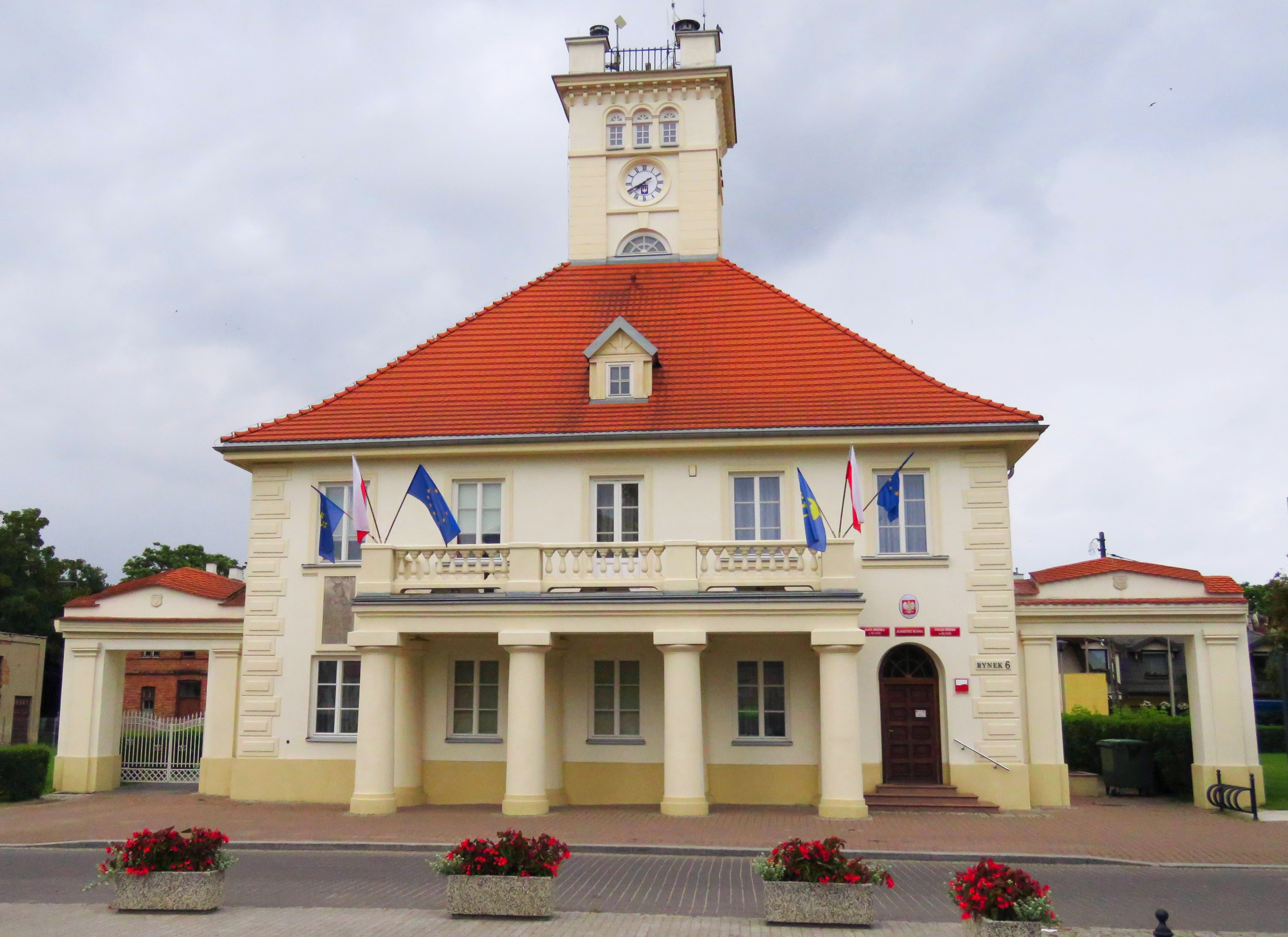
- Town Hall in Błonie, seat of the gmina office

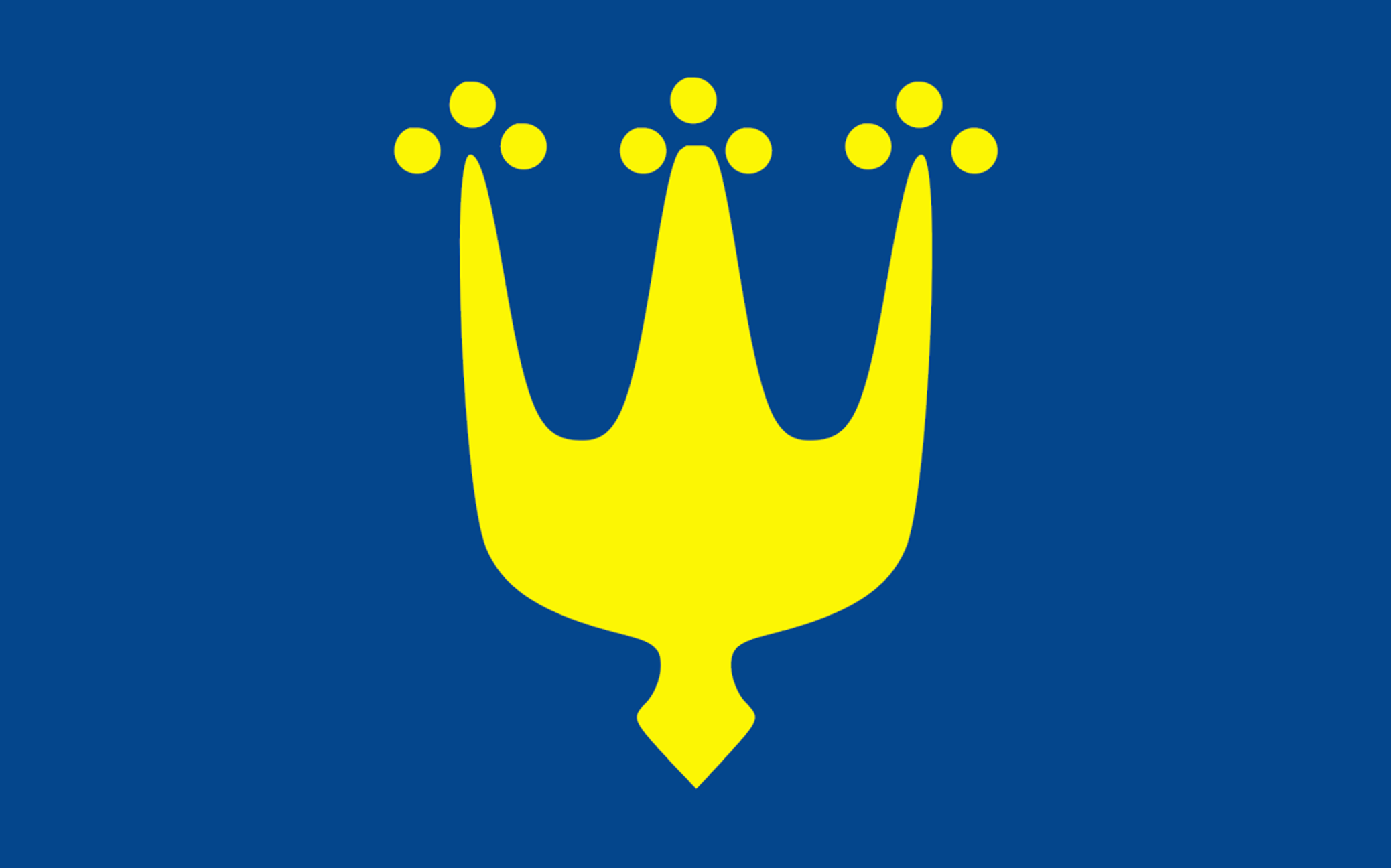
- Flag Coat of arms
- Interactive map of Gmina Błonie
- Coordinates (Błonie): 52°12′N 20°37′E
- Country: Poland
- Voivodeship: Masovian
- County: Warsaw West
- Seat: Błonie

Area
  - Total: 85.84 km^{2} (33.14 sq mi)

Population (2013)
  - Total: 21,133
  - Density: 246.2/km^{2} (637.6/sq mi)
  - Urban: 12,570
  - Rural: 8,563
- Time zone: UTC+1 (CET)
  - Summer (DST): UTC+2 (CEST)
- Website: http://www.blonie.pl/

Gmina Błonie is an urban-rural gmina (administrative district) in Warsaw West County, Masovian Voivodeship, in east-central Poland. Its seat is the town of Błonie, which lies approximately 13 kilometres (8 mi) west of Ożarów Mazowiecki and 27 km (17 mi) west of Warsaw.

The gmina covers an area of 85.84 square kilometres (33.1 sq mi), and as of 2006 its total population is 19,837, of which the population of Błonie is 12,259, and the population of the rural part of the gmina is 7,578.

== Villages ==
Apart from the town of Błonie, Gmina Błonie contains the villages and settlements of Białutki, Białuty, Bieniewice, Bieniewo-Parcela, Bieniewo-Wieś, Błonie-Wieś, Bramki, Cesinek, Cholewy, Dębówka, Górna Wieś, Konstantów, Kopytów, Łąki, Łaźniew, Łaźniewek, Marysinek, Nowa Górna, Nowa Wieś, Nowe Faszczyce, Nowy Łuszczewek, Odrzywół, Pass, Piorunów, Radonice, Radzików, Radzików-Wieś, Rochaliki, Rokitno, Rokitno-Majątek, Stare Faszczyce, Stary Łuszczewek, Wawrzyszew, Witanów, Witki, Wola Łuszczewska and Żukówka.

== Neighbouring gminas ==
Gmina Błonie is bordered by the gminas of Baranów, Brwinów, Grodzisk Mazowiecki, Leszno, Ożarów Mazowiecki and Teresin.
