= Warsaw West County =

Warsaw West County Powiat warszawski zachodni
- County
- Flag Coat of arms

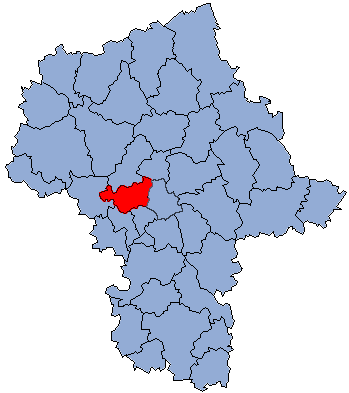
- Location within the voivodeship

- Division into gminas
- Coordinates (Ożarów Mazowiecki): 52°13′N 20°48′E
- Country: Poland
- Voivodeship: Masovian
- Seat: Ożarów Mazowiecki
- Gminas: Total 7: Gmina Błonie; Gmina Izabelin; Gmina Kampinos; Gmina Leszno; Gmina Łomianki; Gmina Ożarów Mazowiecki; Gmina Stare Babice

Area
  - Total: 532.99 km^{2} (205.79 sq mi)

Population (2019)
  - Total: 117,783
  - Density: 220.99/km^{2} (572.35/sq mi)
  - Urban: 41,002
  - Rural: 76,781
- Car plates: WZ
- Website: www.pwz.pl

The Warsaw West County (Polish: powiat warszawski zachodni) is a county in Masovian Voivodeship, located in east-central Poland, with its seat of government located in Ożarów Mazowiecki. Other towns located in the county are: Łomianki, and Błonie. It was established on January 1, 1999, as a result of the Polish local government reforms. Until 31 December 2005, its seat was located extraterritorially in the city of Warsaw.

The county covers an area of 532.99 square kilometres (205.8 sq mi). As of 2019, its total population is 117,783, out of which the population of Łomianki is 17,022, that of Błonie is 12,231, that of Ożarów Mazowiecki is 11,719, and the rural population is 76,781.

== Neighbouring counties ==
Warsaw West County is bordered by Nowy Dwór County and Legionowo County to the north, the city of Warsaw to the east, Pruszków County to the south, Grodzisk County to the south-west, and Sochaczew County to the west.

== Administrative divisions ==
The county is subdivided into seven gminas (three urban-rural and four rural). These are listed in the following table, in descending order of population.

| Gmina | Type | Area (km^{2}) | Population (2019) | Seat |
|---|---|---|---|---|
| Gmina Łomianki | urban-rural | 38.1 | 26,996 | Łomianki |
| Gmina Ożarów Mazowiecki | urban-rural | 71.3 | 24,991 | Ożarów Mazowiecki |
| Gmina Błonie | urban-rural | 85.8 | 21,597 | Błonie |
| Gmina Stare Babice | rural | 63.5 | 19,054 | Stare Babice |
| Gmina Izabelin | rural | 65.0 | 10,615 | Izabelin |
| Gmina Leszno | rural | 125.0 | 10,193 | Leszno |
| Gmina Kampinos | rural | 84.3 | 4,337 | Kampinos |
