= Street executions in Warsaw (1943–1944) =

Mass executions of Polish hostages carried out on the streets of Warsaw

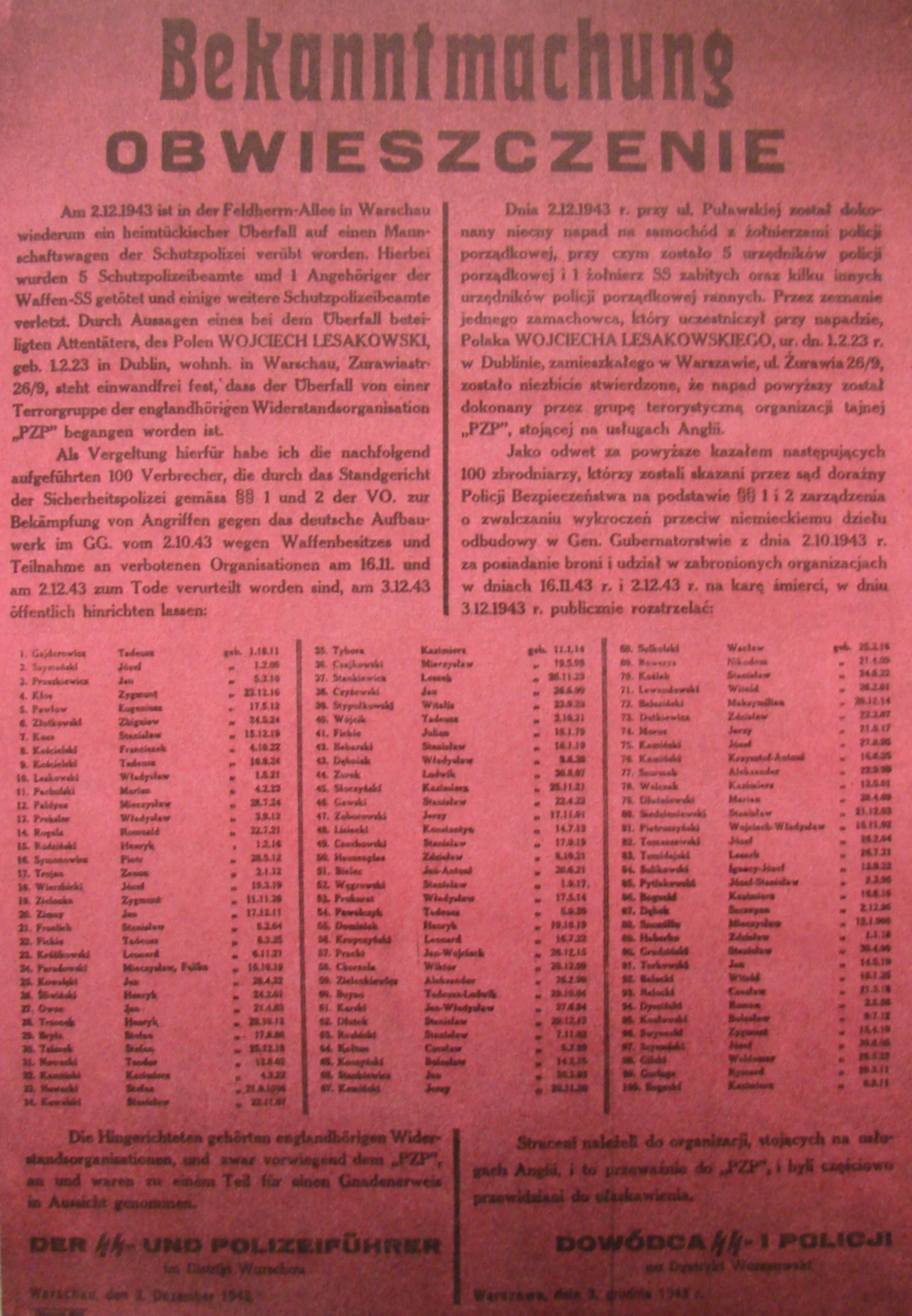
Announcement informing of the execution of 100 Polish hostages. Warsaw, 3 December 1943

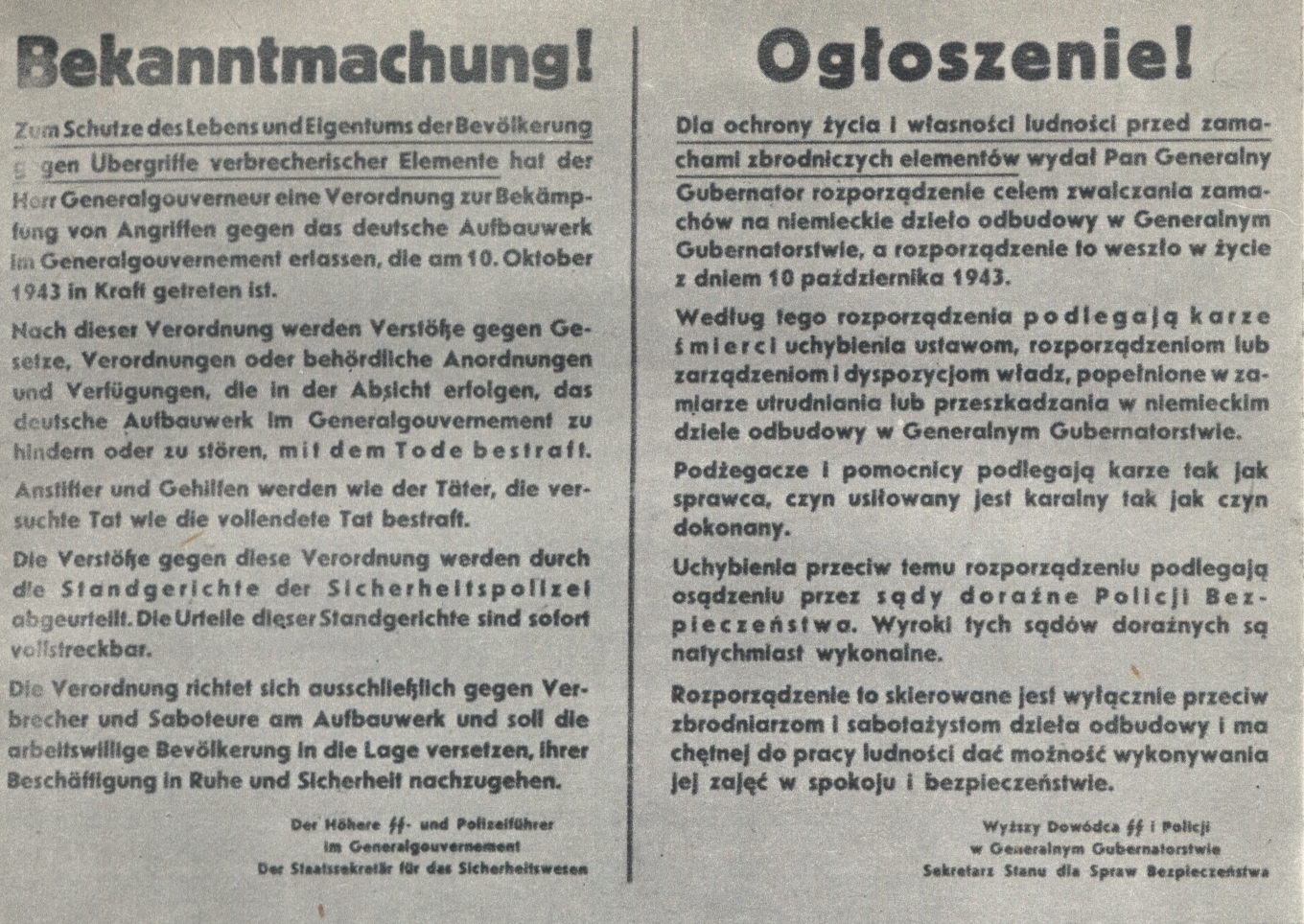
Announcement informing about the enactment of the decree on combating attacks against the German reconstruction effort in the General Government

The street executions in Warsaw in 1943 and 1944 were the mass executions of Polish hostages carried out by the German occupiers on the streets of Warsaw.

The first executions on the streets of the capital took place in mid-October 1943, shortly after SS-Brigadeführer Franz Kutschera assumed the position of SS and police leader for the Warsaw District. During his rule, approximately 5,000 Poles were murdered in Warsaw, of whom at least 1,200 were executed directly on the city's streets. The victims were primarily ordinary Warsaw residents apprehended during mass roundups.

The Germans ceased summary executions in mid-February 1944, following the successful assassination of Kutschera by soldiers of the Home Army's Kedyw unit.

== Origins ==
Warsaw was considered by the German occupiers as the center of Polish resistance against the Nazi "new order". Despite attempts to degrade the former Polish capital to a provincial city within the General Government, Warsaw remained the center of Polish political, intellectual, and cultural life. It also served as the seat of the Polish Underground State authorities and hosted particularly strong and well-organized resistance structures. General Governor Hans Frank wrote in his diary on 14 December 1943:

There is a one place in this country which is a source of all our misfortunes – it is Warsaw. Without Warsaw we wouldn't have four-fifths of the troubles which we're facing now. Warsaw is the focus of all disturbances, the place from which discontent is spread through the whole country.

From the earliest days of the occupation, the Germans employed widespread terror against the capital's population. This terror was primarily directed at representatives of the Polish political and intellectual elite, the Jewish community, and individuals connected to the resistance movement in any way. Under trivial pretexts, the principle of collective responsibility was frequently applied. Warsaw's prisons and detention centers – Pawiak, the detention center on Daniłowiczowska Street, Mokotów Prison, and the Gestapo headquarters basement on Szucha Avenue – were filled with arrestees. Street roundups, forced labor deportations, concentration camp deportations, and mass executions became everyday occurrences. Political prisoners from Warsaw were usually secretly executed in areas inaccessible to outsiders. Execution sites included the parliamentary gardens, Kabaty Woods, Szwedzkie Góry in Bemowo, Sękocin Forest near Magdalenka, Chojnów Forests near Stefanów, Laski, Łuże Dunes, and Wólka Węglowa on the outskirts of Kampinos Forest, and especially the "death glade" near Palmiry. From spring 1943, Polish political prisoners were mass executed in the ruins of the Warsaw Ghetto. A public exception was the hanging of 50 Poles on 16 October 1942. (Note: All the victims were Pawiak prisoners. They were hanged in groups of 10 at five points on the far outskirts of Warsaw and in the suburban zone – i.e. in Wola and Pelcowizna, as well as in Marki, Rembertów and Szczęśliwce (Bartoszewski (1970b, p. 205)).)

The occupiers' policy hardened in the fall of 1943, as the Germans intensified efforts to break the growing strength of the Polish resistance movement. At the request of the Sicherheitspolizei, General Governor Hans Frank issued a decree on 2 October 1943 on combating attacks against the German reconstruction effort in the General Government (effective October 10). The decree fully sanctioned the occupiers' use of collective responsibility, stipulating, among other things, that instigators and accomplices are subject to the same punishment as perpetrators and attempted acts are punishable as completed acts. In practice, this meant that entirely random individuals could be executed. Confidential guidelines for applying this act specified that even illegal slaughter or black market trade could be considered an attack on the German reconstruction effort. The decree provided only one form of punishment – immediate execution. It also made the summary courts of the security police (Standgericht) the sole authorities competent to hear cases of attacks on the German reconstruction effort. According to Frank himself (19 October 1943), these courts were granted extraordinary powers, setting aside any inhibiting formal objections. (Note: A commentary on the ordinance on combating attacks against the German reconstruction effort in the General Government proclaimed in addition that a German policeman has the right to shoot anyone he meets on the street who appears suspicious to him (Strzembosz (1983, p. 363)).)

The increased harshness towards the population of the General Government translated particularly into increased repression against Warsaw's population, where the German police authorities assessed the situation as particularly tense. This issue was discussed, among other things, at a conference with Governor General Frank in Kraków on 27 September 1943. It was announced that a major roundup would be conducted in Warsaw targeting hiding Jews and individuals living in the city without registration. It was emphasized that all persons in Warsaw unable to sufficiently identify themselves would be shot, as all those hiding in Warsaw must be considered members of terrorist groups. During the conference, SS-Oberführer Walther Bierkamp, head of the SD and security police in the General Government, emphasized that the planned actions were intended to make the Polish population feel that the German authorities were now really getting serious.

The drastic intensification of terror against the capital's population coincided with SS-Brigadeführer Franz Kutschera taking over as SS and police leader for the Warsaw District (25 September 1943). The new SS- und Polizeiführer was a proponent of a hardline policy against the nations conquered by the Third Reich. The means by which he intended to pacify Warsaw were mass executions of hostages, carried out in retaliation for any anti-German actions. Unlike previous practices, part of the victims was planned to be publicly executed on the city's streets. (Note: SS-Brigadeführer Paul Otto Geibel, Kutschera's successor as SS and police leader for the Warsaw District, claimed during a post-war interrogation by a Polish prosecutor that the idea of conducting mass executions of hostages on the streets of Warsaw originated from Berlin. Kutschera consistently carried out this plan despite objections raised by the local police authorities (Biernacki (1989, p. 142)).) The Germans hoped this would intimidate the capital's residents and drive a wedge between the resistance and the civilian population.

== Street executions during Kutschera's rule ==
=== Beginning of the repressive operation ===
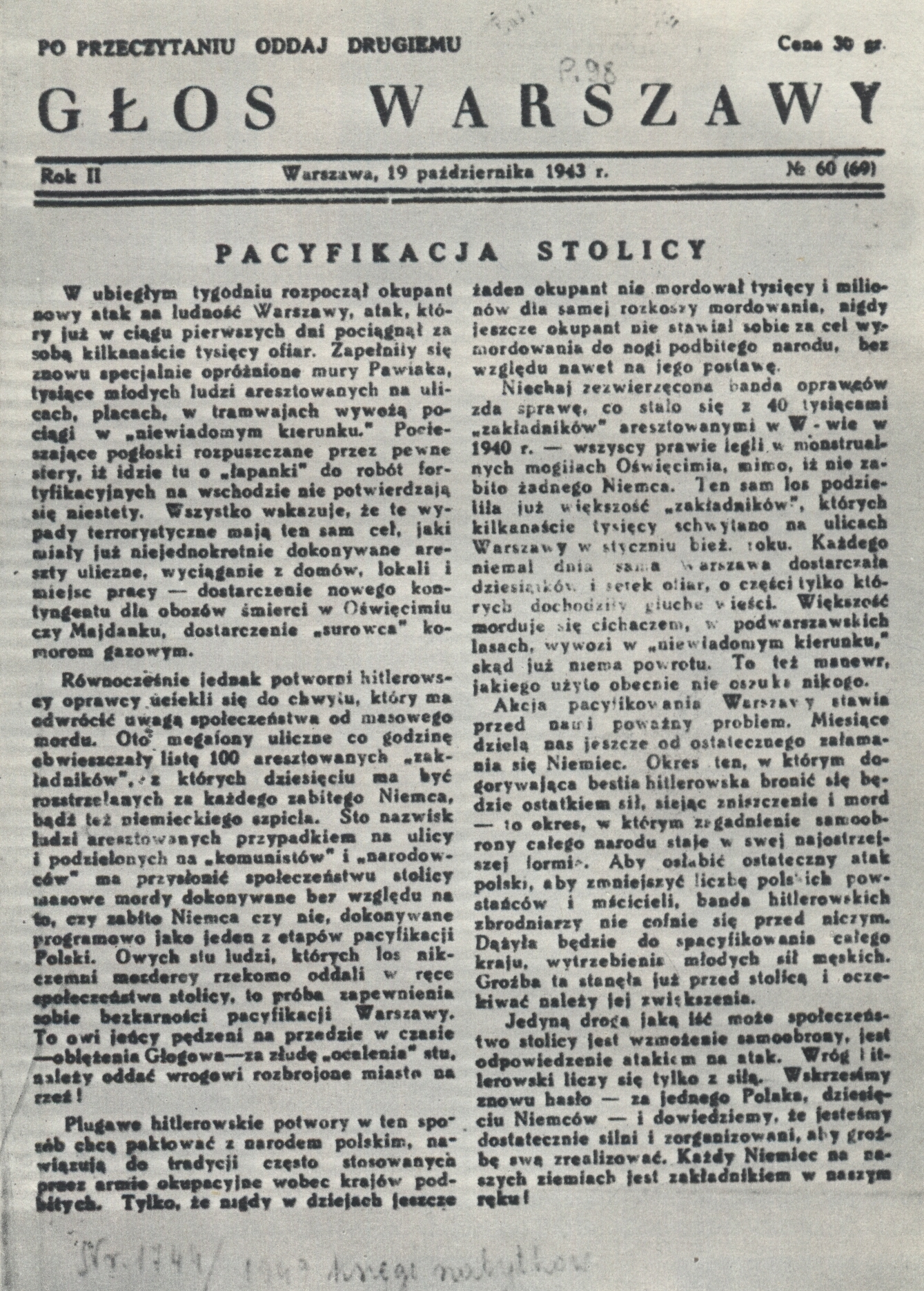
Article on the new wave of German terror, published in the Warsaw organ of the Polish Workers' Party

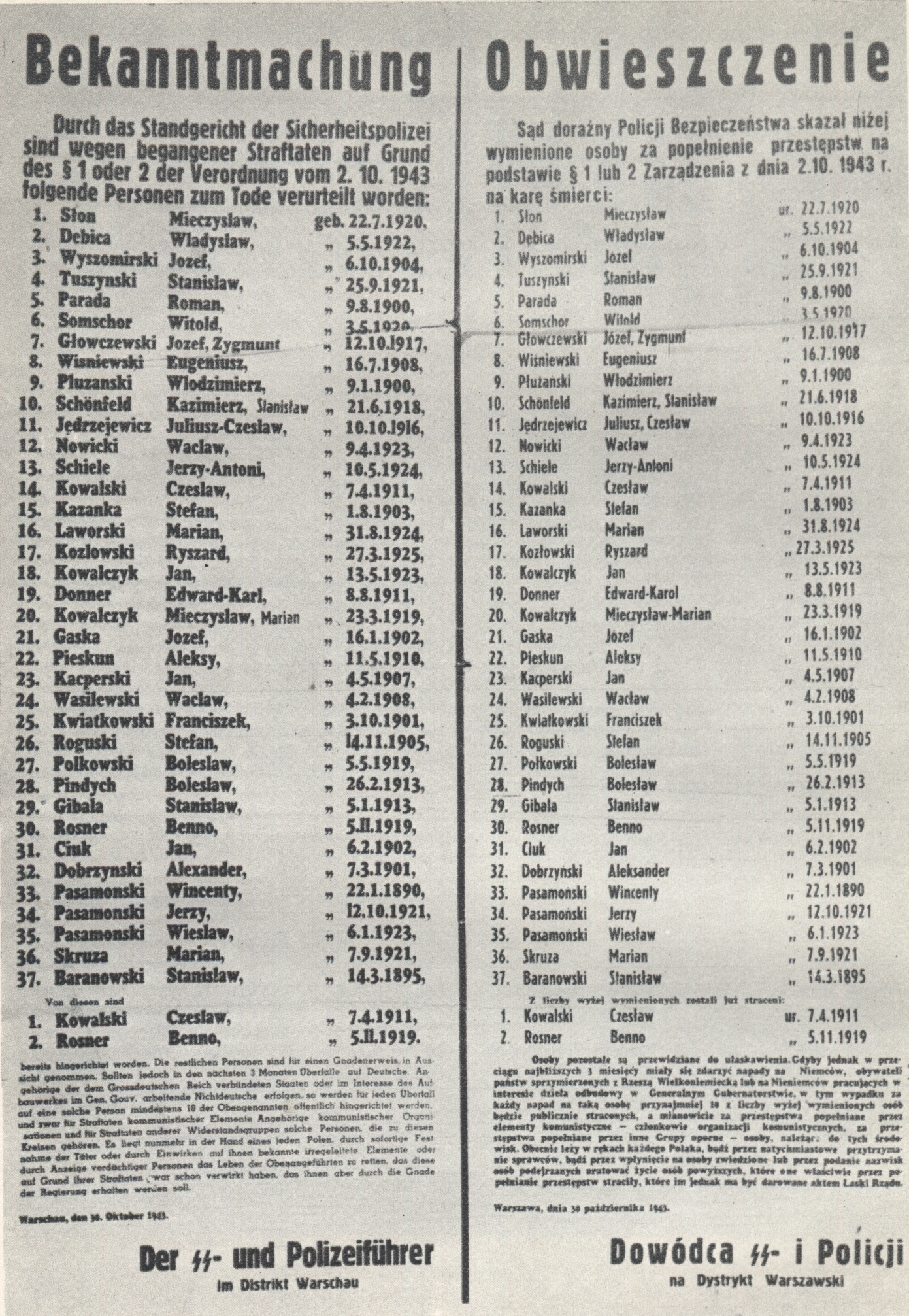
Announcement from 30 October 1943 informing about the sentencing to death of 37 Poles. It states that two convicts have already been executed, and the rest will be treated as hostages

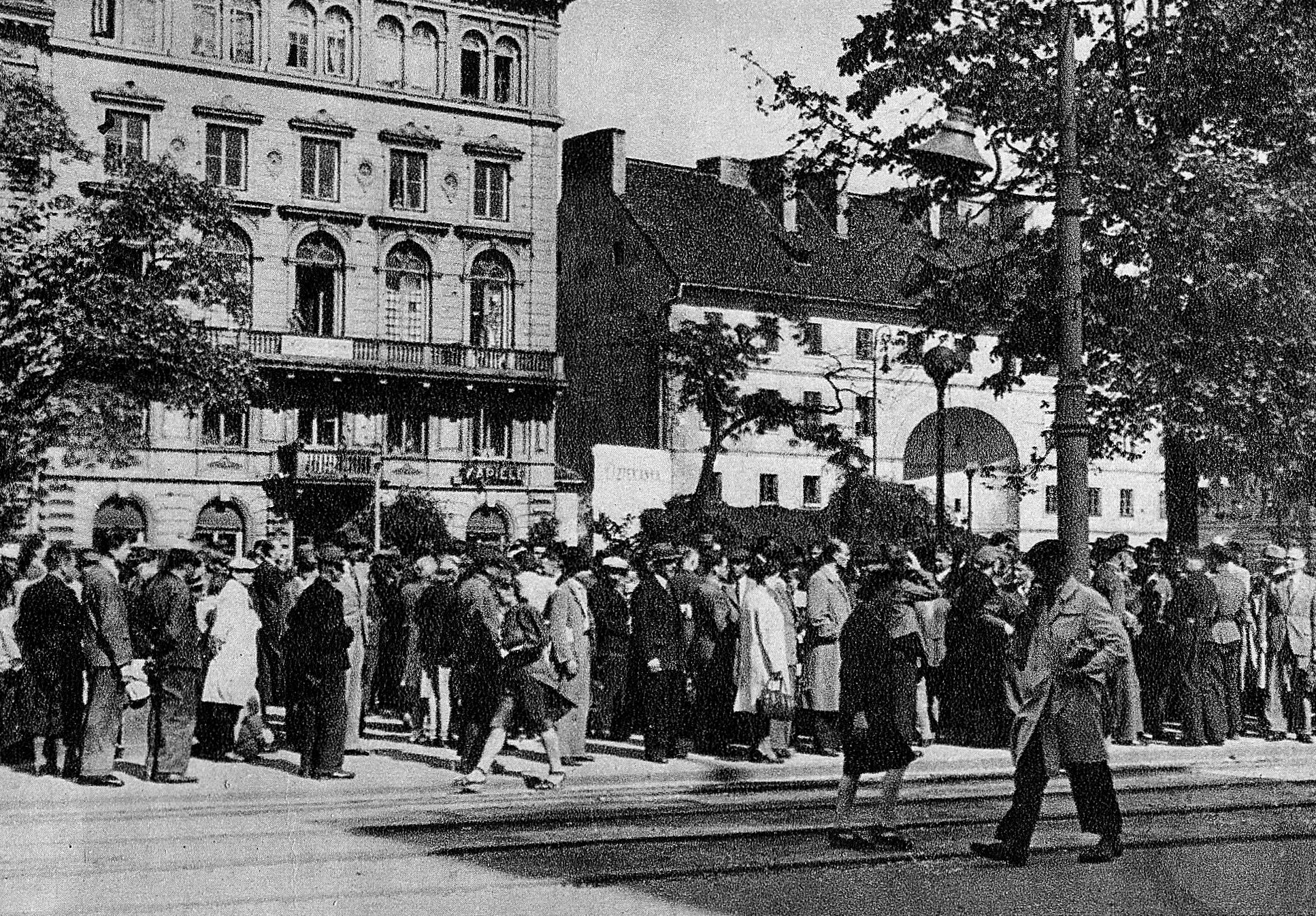
Residents of Warsaw gathered under one of the street loudspeakers through which German authorities' decrees and information about detained hostages and conducted executions were announced

In the first decade of October 1943, rumors began circulating in Warsaw about a major repressive action planned by the occupier, allegedly aiming to murder 20,000 city residents. Meanwhile, on October 13 – three days after the Regulation on combating attacks on German reconstruction work… came into effect – Warsaw was struck by an unprecedented wave of street roundups. Mass raids took place in many parts of the city, particularly affecting the Śródmieście area (including the vicinity of the Warszawa Główna railway station and Three Crosses Square). Many people were also arrested in their homes. The underground Biuletyn Informacyjny estimated that the Germans arrested nearly 1,500 Warsaw residents that day. In Pawiak alone, between 350 and 450 people were detained. "Old" prisoners noted that the new arrivals were not registered in the prison records. Additionally, they were not subjected to the usual procedure, which included being sent to the baths or having their personal belongings deposited. Instead, the new prisoners were directed to special cells marked Aktion (English: Operation). Previously, only Jews caught on the "Aryan side" were treated this way in Pawiak, who were then executed summarily after a short stay in prison. For the next several days, Pawiak guards brutally tortured the prisoners brought in from the roundups. Several murders occurred.

From then on, roundups were carried out by the Germans almost daily (Note: Several days of roundups took place around 1 November, from 2 to 5 December and on Christmas, among others (Landau (1962, pp. 364, 452, 505)).) – sometimes several times a day, in different parts of the city. The roundups involved Gestapo and Ordnungspolizei officers, Waffen-SS members, and occasionally Wehrmacht and Luftwaffe soldiers, as well as German youth from the Hitler Youth. Typically, German cordons closed off a larger section of a street or even entire blocks, after which the raid methodically rounded up all Polish men present on the streets, in shops, in cafes, or on halted trams. Sometimes women and elderly people were also caught. Those arrested were forced to stand with their hands raised against the nearest building, and after a superficial search – sometimes even without checking documents (Note: If the detainee was a young man, the Germans, as a rule, took him immediately to the Pawiak prison – without any search or checking of documents (Bartoszewski (2007, p. 123)).) – they were loaded into police trucks and taken to Pawiak or to transition cells in the basement of the Gestapo building at 25 Szucha Avenue (so-called "trams"). The Germans did not honor any certificates, except those confirming employment in institutions working for the war effort (German: kriegswichtige Betriebe). Anyone trying to escape or reacting too slowly to commands was shot without warning. In the first week of the "operation" alone, 27 bodies of people shot during street roundups were brought to the Warsaw morgue at Oczki Street (including the bodies of several women). In Pawiak, roundup victims were crammed into crowded cells – without registration in prison records or fulfilling other formalities. They were not subjected to any investigation or even interrogations. Additionally, those detained in the "operation" were kept in strict isolation from the other prisoners. Only German or Ukrainian guards had access to their cells, who brutally mistreated the detainees. Murders in cells or in the prison yard were frequent.

Street roundups were accompanied by numerous individual arrests. These included officials of the Polish Municipal Board. Over time, the Germans reduced the frequency of the roundups, replacing them with increased activity of street patrols, which massively checked and searched random passersby. Anyone arousing any suspicion or attracting attention for various reasons was arrested and taken to Pawiak (sometimes up to 200 people were arrested in this way daily). Additionally, in the fall of 1943, roundups and mass arrests affected numerous towns in the Warsaw District – including Błonie, Garwolin, Legionowo, Łowicz, Mińsk Mazowiecki, Ostrów Mazowiecka, Pruszków, Radzymin, Rembertów, Sochaczew, Tłuszcz, and Żyrardów. People detained there were usually brought to Pawiak.

Large-scale roundups were not new to Warsaw residents. However, while they were previously organized to gather contingents of forced labor or to form transports to concentration camps, the victims of the October raids were treated as hostages. On the morning of October 15, the first of many Kutschera's announcements (appearing anonymously as Commander of the SS and police for the Warsaw District) was made through street loudspeakers. The announcement reported the execution of 7 people and announced that for every injured German, 10 Poles would be executed – the same day and at the site of the attack. Additionally, a list of 60 hostages to be executed first was published (in announcements broadcast in the evening, this list expanded to 100 names). Among the hostages were several women. The first street execution by the Germans took place the next day. Around 4:00 PM, 25 prisoners were taken from Pawiak, their hands tied with ropes and their eyes blindfolded with black bands. Five hostages were shot in the ruins of the ghetto, and the remaining twenty were executed at 141 Independence Avenue in Mokotów (between Madaliński and Różana streets). On the night between October 16 and 17, another 9 prisoners were shot in the ghetto. The next day, another 25 hostages were taken from Pawiak. Five prisoners were murdered in the ghetto ruins, and the remaining twenty were executed next to the Telephone Directorate building at 17 Pius XI Street (now Piękna Street). Street executions continued uninterrupted until mid-February 1944.

=== Course of a typical street execution ===
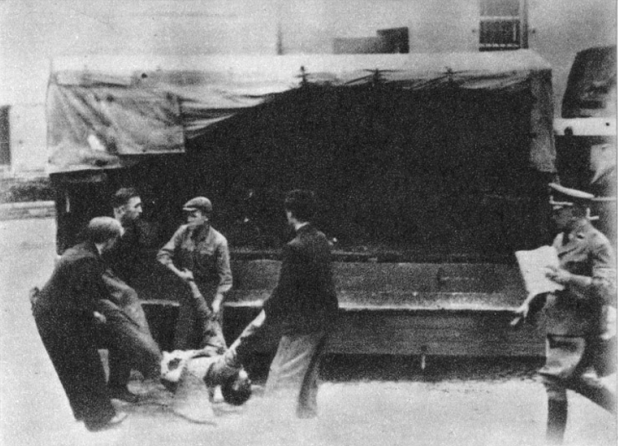
Clearing the bodies of street execution victims

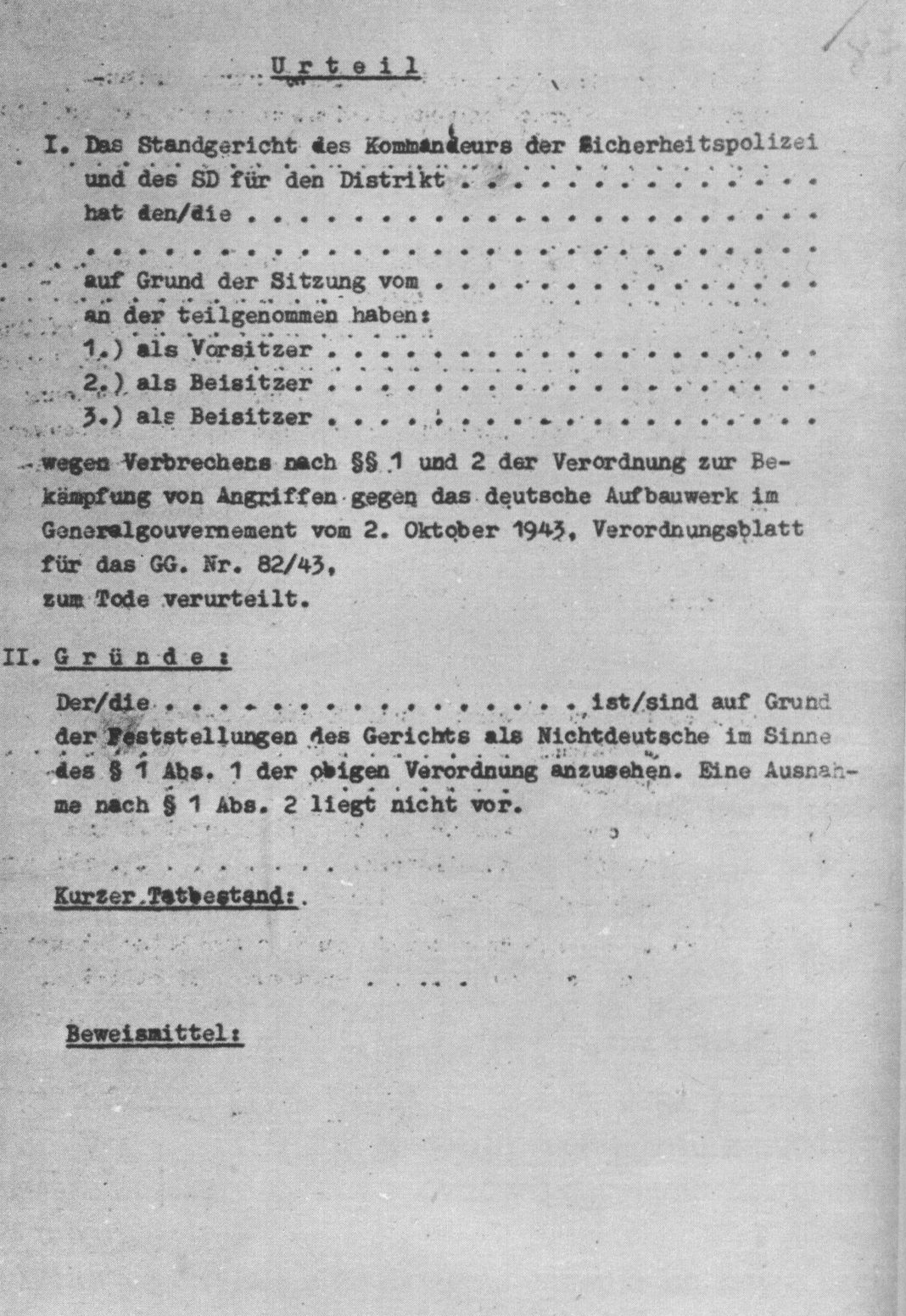
Death sentence form used by summary police courts

The executions carried out on the streets of Warsaw are often referred to as "public executions". This is a misleading term, as the Germans made efforts to prevent the residents of the capital from witnessing the executions. Streets where the executions were planned were cordoned off in advance by police lines. Nearby shops were closed, and all potential onlookers were chased away. The Germans also banned observing executions from the windows of houses. Those who did not comply with this order were shot without warning.

To maintain the appearance of legality, many hostages were sentenced to death by a summary police court. In reality, the proceedings before the Standgericht were a mockery of a judicial process, conducted in an extremely simplified and expedited manner. Typically, a Gestapo officer employed in section IV A 3b ("summary court and retaliatory measures") at the office of the commander of the SD and security police for the Warsaw District would simply fill out a death sentence form, with the sentence itself usually pre-printed. The completed form was then submitted for the signature of three security police officers, who, by the commander's order, served as rotating members of the summary court that week. After this procedure was completed, Section IV A 3b, in consultation with the Schutzpolizei command, set the execution date, location, and form, as well as the number of people to be executed. Among those sentenced were primarily individuals accused of minor offenses and random victims of street roundups, as prisoners of interest to the Gestapo were usually spared until the end of the investigation. Often, the decision of life or death of a detainee was made by junior clerks in the secretariat of Department IV at the office of the commander of the SD and security police for the Warsaw District, who, based on the department head's guidelines regarding the planned size of the executions, compiled an appropriately large list of convicts – choosing names from a "pool" of prisoners designated for execution when the opportunity arose. Many Warsaw residents detained during street roundups were murdered after spending one night in Pawiak, sometimes only a few hours after being detained.

At Pawiak, amid shouts and brutal shoving, the convicts were loaded onto trucks. Initially, they were taken to execution in the same clothes in which they were arrested. After a while, however, the Germans began taking away the victims' clothes, shoes, and outerwear. From then on, they were executed barefoot and in underwear, sometimes dressed in prison overalls or paper "ersatz" clothing. Usually, at Pawiak, the convicts' eyes were blindfolded, their hands tied behind their backs, and they were transported to the execution site in pairs. Witnesses recalled that during the first executions, some hostages tried to shout patriotic slogans or sing songs. As a result, the Germans began to put sacks over the victims' heads and sometimes even sealed their mouths with plaster and adhesive tape. Due to the unnatural calm with which some hostages went to execution, witnesses speculated that the victims were given drugs or strong sedatives before death. It was suspected that the rags used to bind their mouths were soaked with a numbing substance. Witnesses recalled that many convicts struggled to stand on their own, leading to rumors that significant amounts of blood were drawn from convicts in cases of active resistance. Very rarely were convicts read the death sentence before being taken to execution.

Executions were usually carried out according to a uniform scenario. First, a strong police escort cordoned off the planned execution site. Then, the execution squad, usually consisting of about 20–30 Schutzpolizei officers (sometimes Pawiak guards also participated in the execution), arrived. Finally, trucks carrying the convicts arrived. Groups of between 5 and 10 people (depending on the overall number of convicts) were led in front of the execution squad and then shot in volleys of rifle fire or machine-gun fire. Victims showing signs of life were finished off with a pistol shot by the execution squad commander. After several minutes, the execution was over. Then, a prisoner command, usually consisting of Jews held in the Warsaw concentration camp, began working. They loaded the bodies of the murdered onto trucks and cleaned the street, washing away the blood with water from hydrants and sprinkling sand. Sometimes, to erase traces of the execution, the Germans ordered the street to be scrubbed and the walls, under which the hostages were shot, to be plastered. Requests from families to release the bodies of their loved ones were always denied. The victims' bodies were burned by Warsaw concentration camp prisoners – initially on open pyres in the ghetto ruins, later in the camp crematorium. The clothing and items belonging to the convicts were sorted in Pawiak's warehouses. Some items were appropriated by the staff or distributed to prisoners (in this case, usually the lowest quality clothing). The rest were taken to a warehouse in a house at 14 Szucha Avenue and then distributed to Warsaw's Reichsdeutsche and Volksdeutsche.

To achieve the desired psychological effect, the names of the executed were announced through street megaphones. Then, a list of the names of the next hostages, planned to be executed in the event of another anti-German attack, was read. After some time, megaphone announcements were replaced by posters (Bekanntmachung) on walls. The famous posters – printed on pink paper and usually signed anonymously as Commander of the SS and police for the Warsaw District – first appeared on Warsaw's streets on 31 October 1943 (dated October 30). These announcements tried to omit the fact that women were among the executed. According to SS-Oberführer Bierkamp's recommendations, the announcements always informed that the executed hostages were designated for pardon. The occupiers hoped to encourage the Polish population to cooperate with the German security apparatus (to save the next hostages). Moreover, to strengthen the intimidation effect, the Germans spread appropriately fabricated rumors in Warsaw. Among others, there was a rumor that a certain Volksdeutsche allegedly stated that if Poles knew what awaited them, they would poison themselves in advance. There were also reports that trenches dug in squares and the outskirts of Warsaw were intended as mass graves for Poles.

Meanwhile, after the first executions, groups of Warsaw residents began to spontaneously gather at the execution sites. Candles were lit, wreaths and bouquets of flowers were laid, and prayers were loudly recited. Some people soaked handkerchiefs in the blood of the murdered, later treating them as relics. Initially, the Germans tolerated these gatherings, as they hoped they would help deepen the atmosphere of terror in the city. Later, when it became clear that they created opportunities for patriotic demonstrations, the German patrols' reactions became very brutal. Improvised memorial sites were demolished, and gatherings were dispersed. Sometimes, policemen opened fire without warning on praying people.

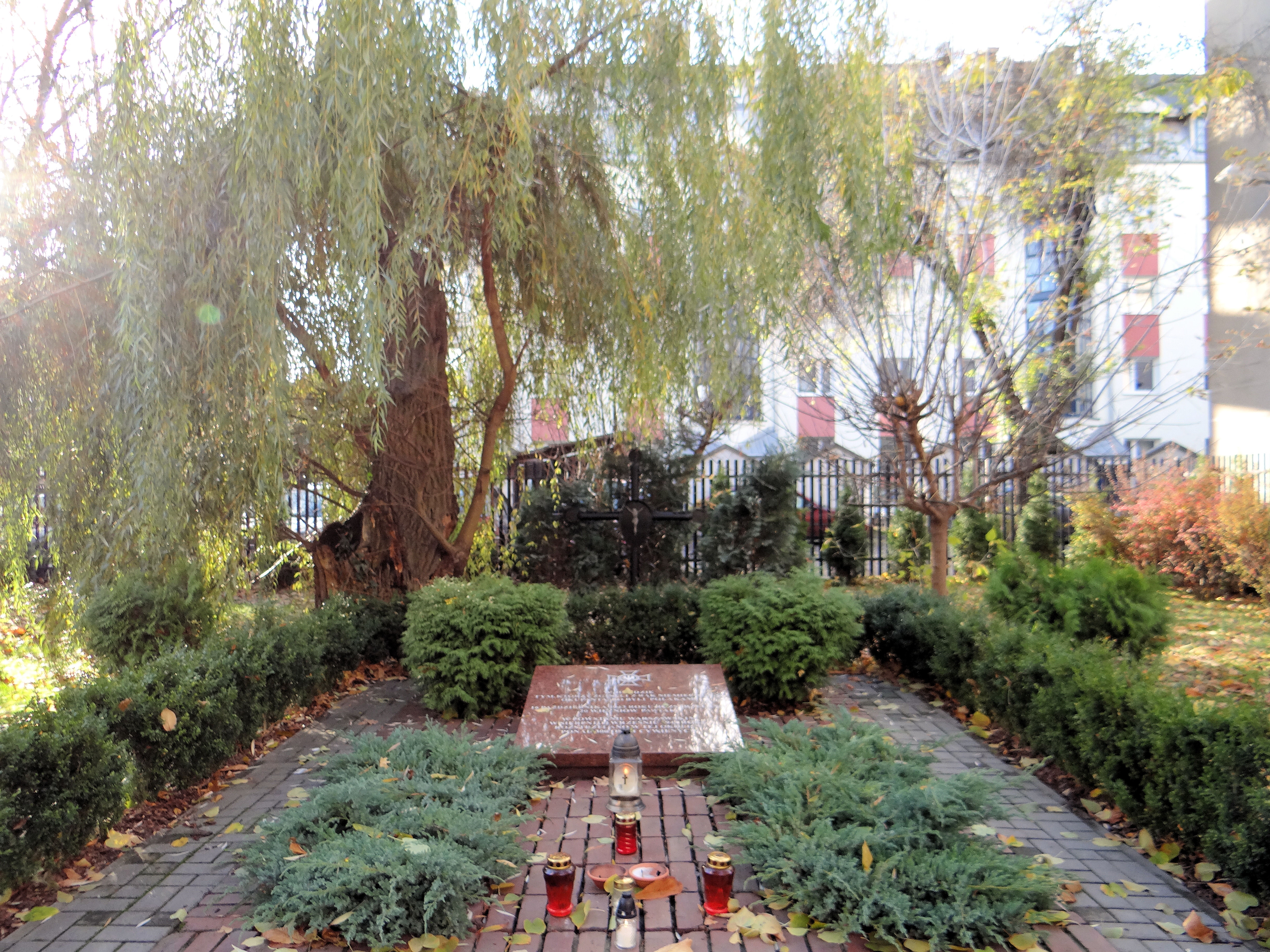
Plaques commemorating the first street execution in Warsaw (141 Independence Avenue)

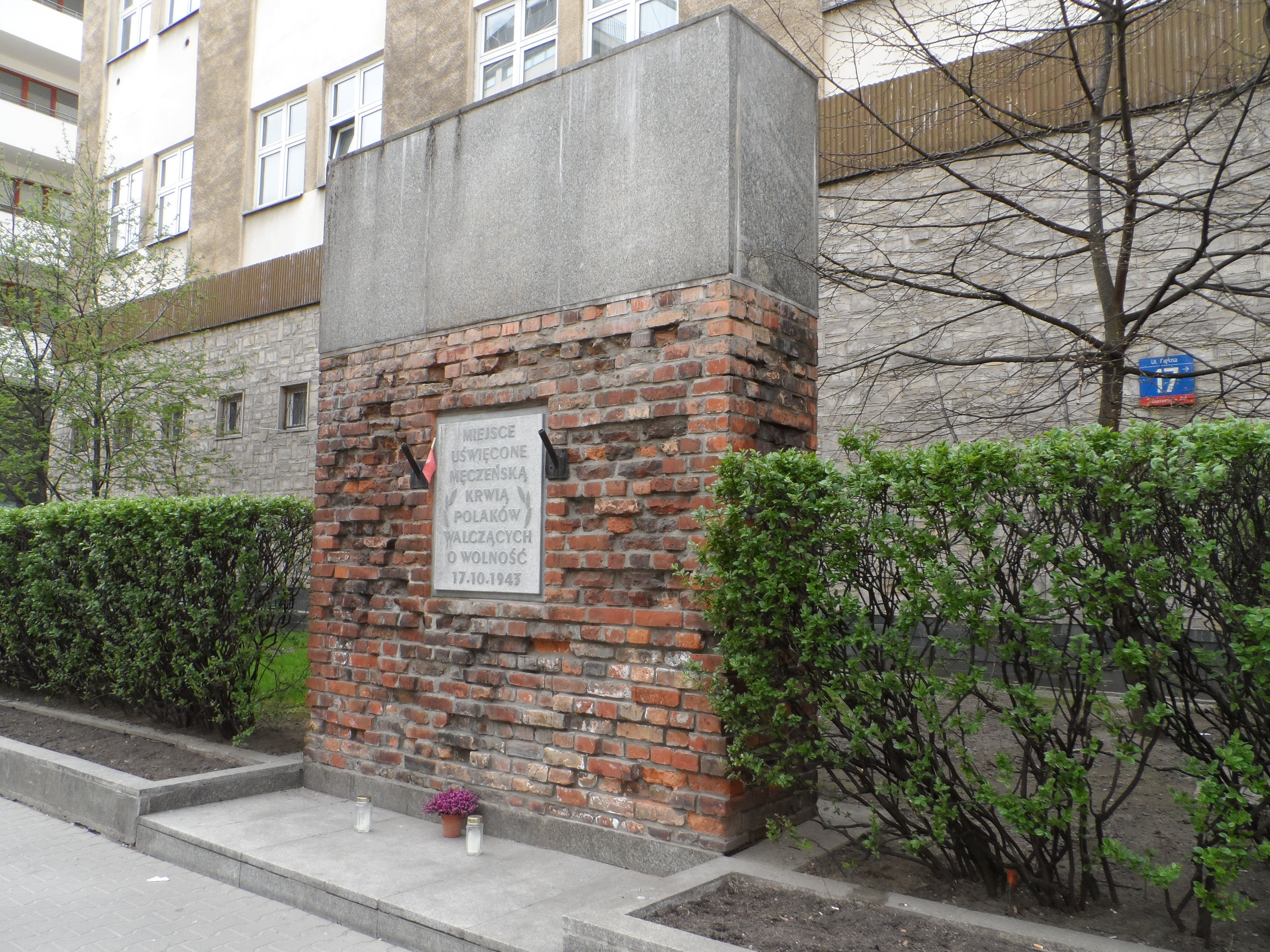
Plaque commemorating the execution of hostages at Pius XI Street (now 17 Piękna Street)

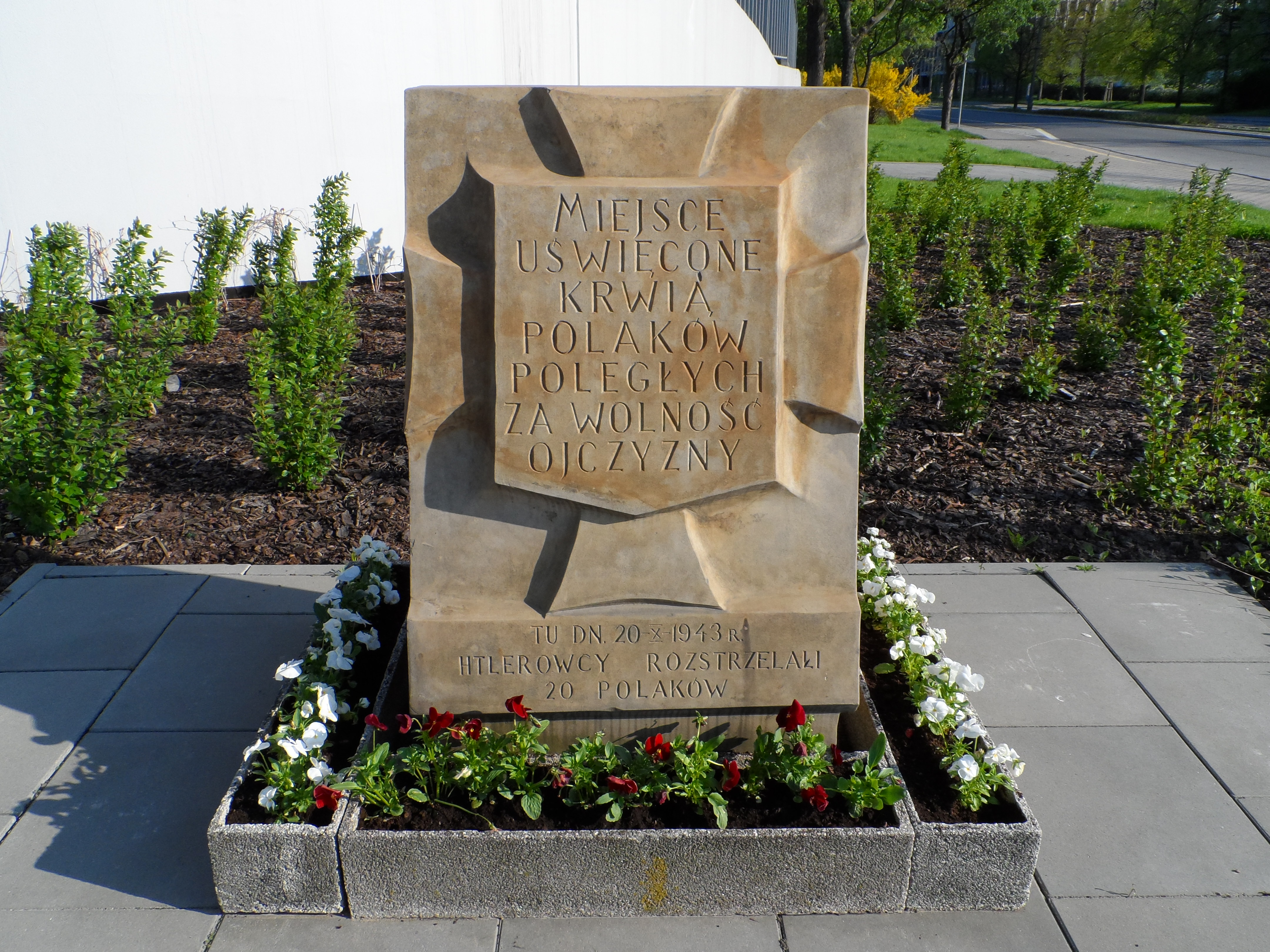
Plaque commemorating the execution of hostages at the embankment near the Warszawa Gdańska railway station

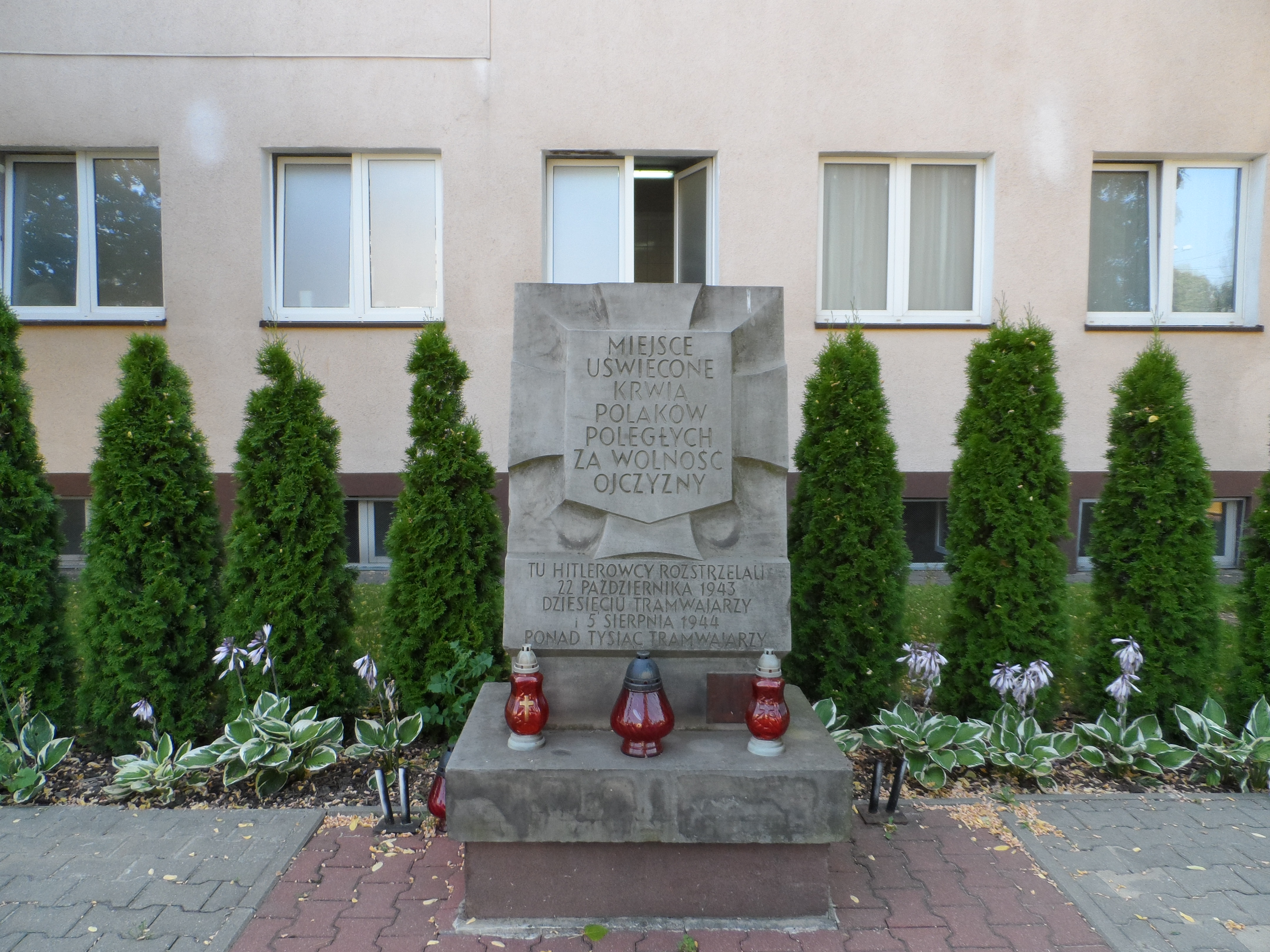
Plaque at the Wola tram depot (2 Młynarska Street), commemorating, among others, hostages shot in October 1943

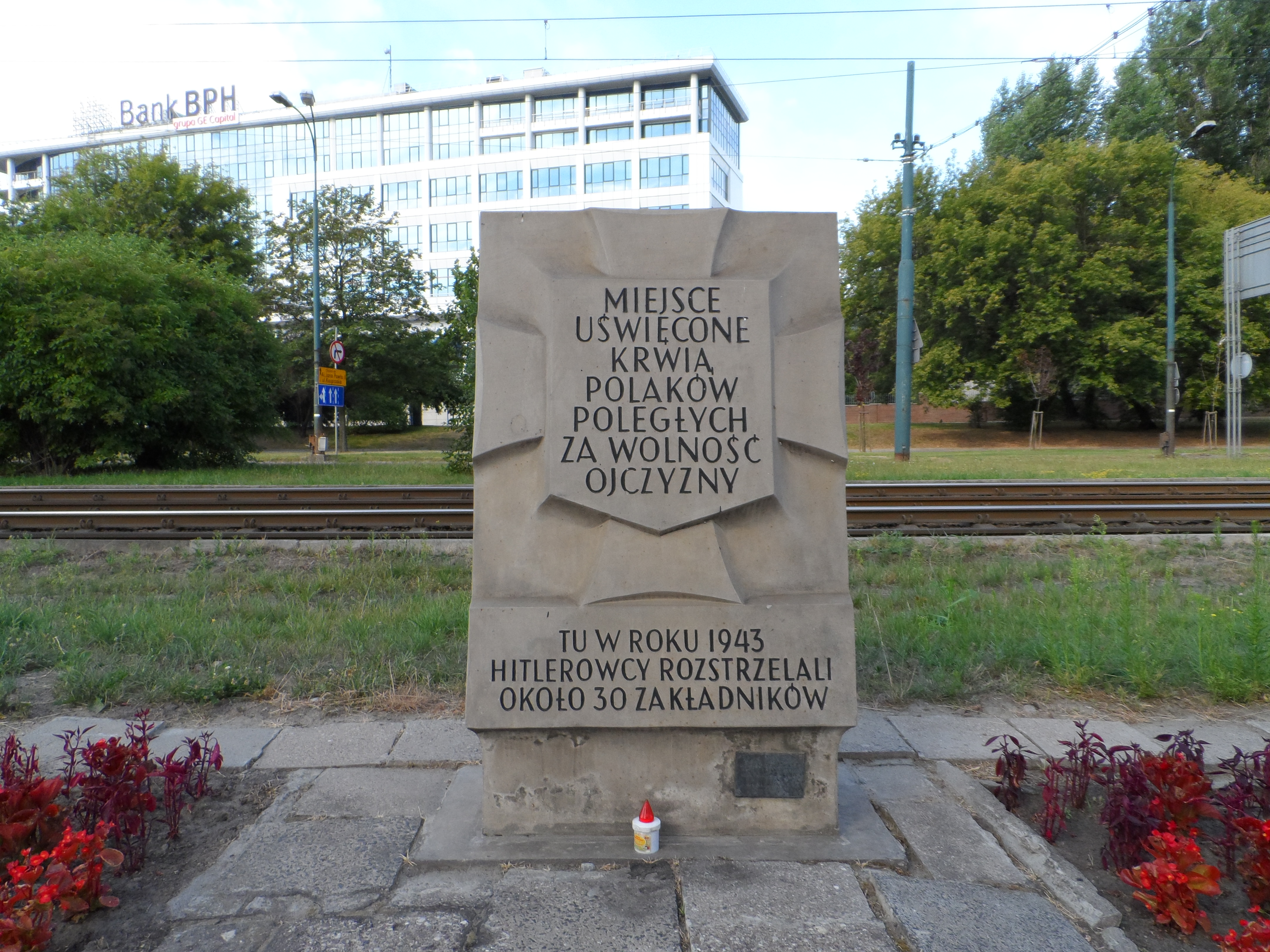
Plaque commemorating the execution of hostages at the corner of Towarowa and Łucka streets

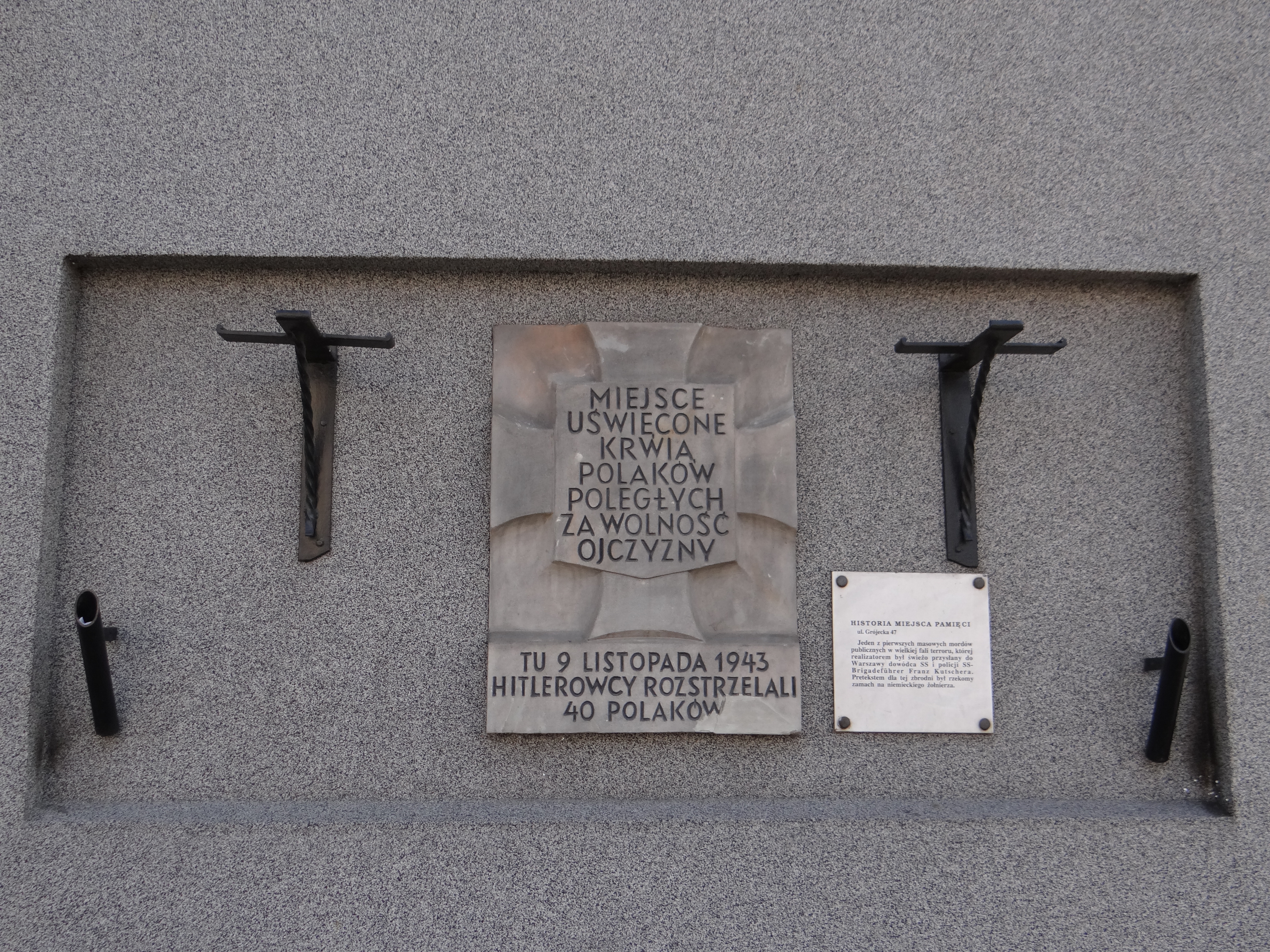
Plaque commemorating the execution of hostages at Grójecka Street

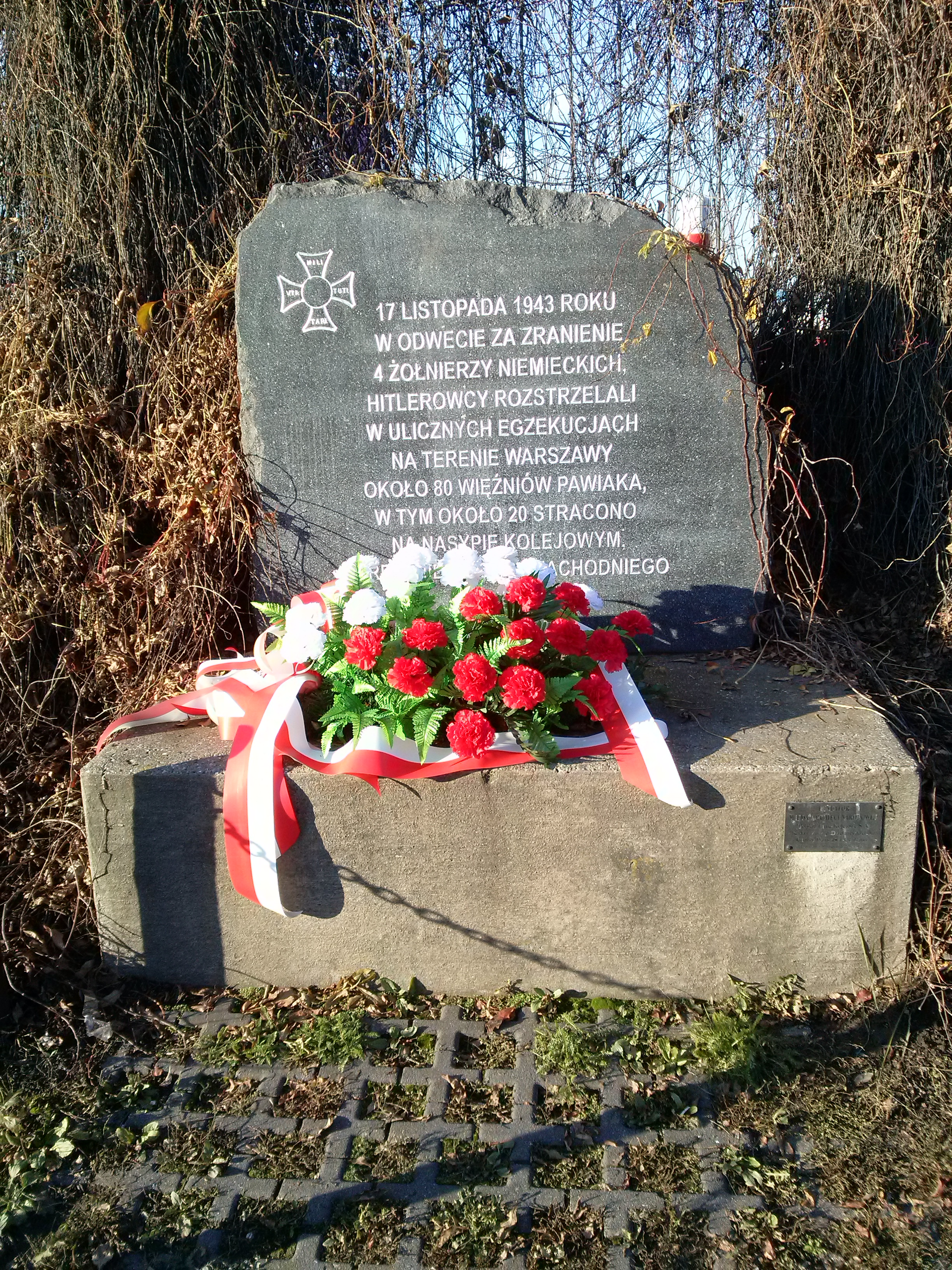
Plaque commemorating the execution of hostages at the railway embankment near the Warszawa Zachodnia station

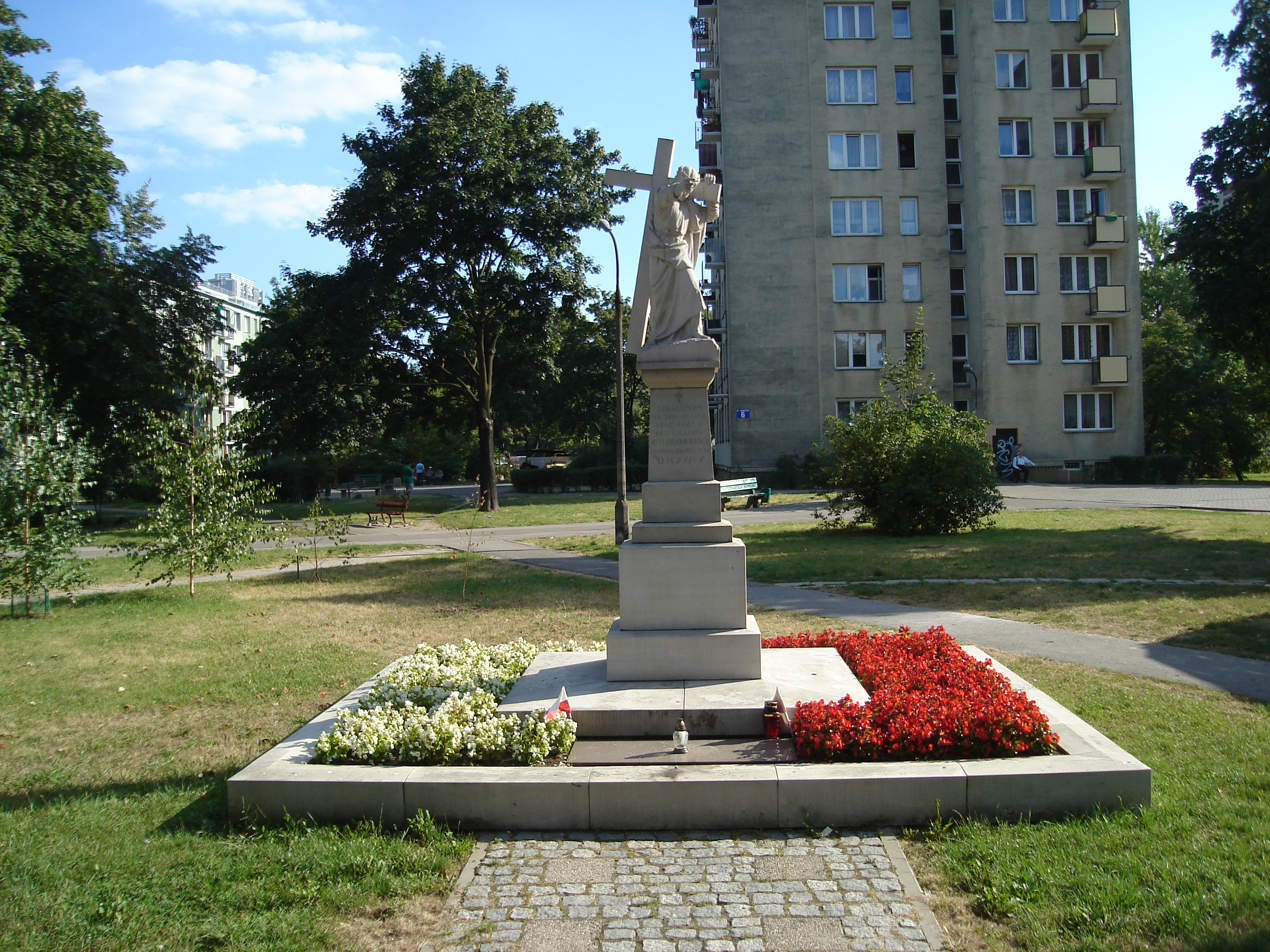
Monument commemorating the execution of hostages at Białołęcka Street (now Suwalska Street)

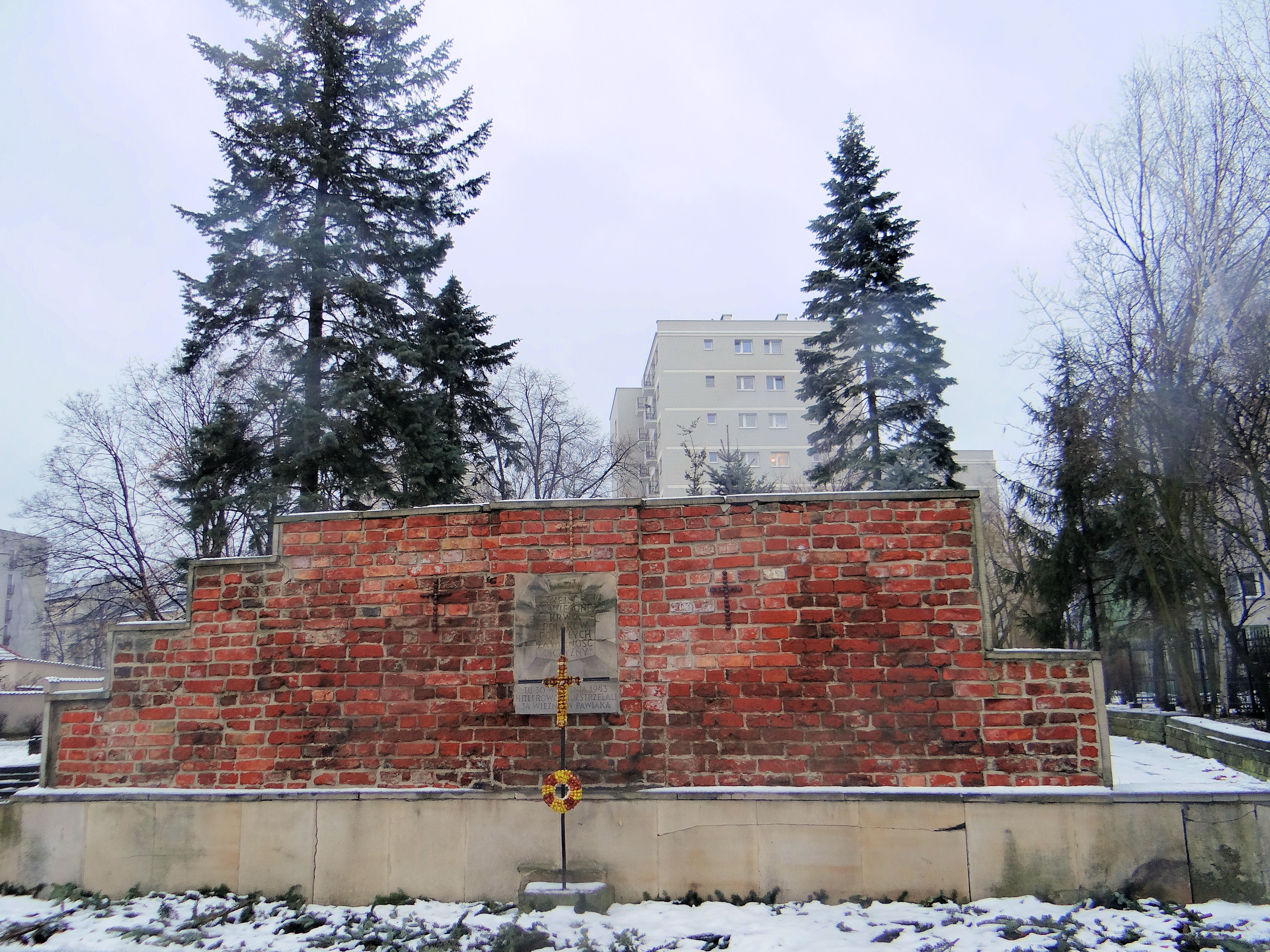
Plaque commemorating the execution of hostages at 63 Solec Street

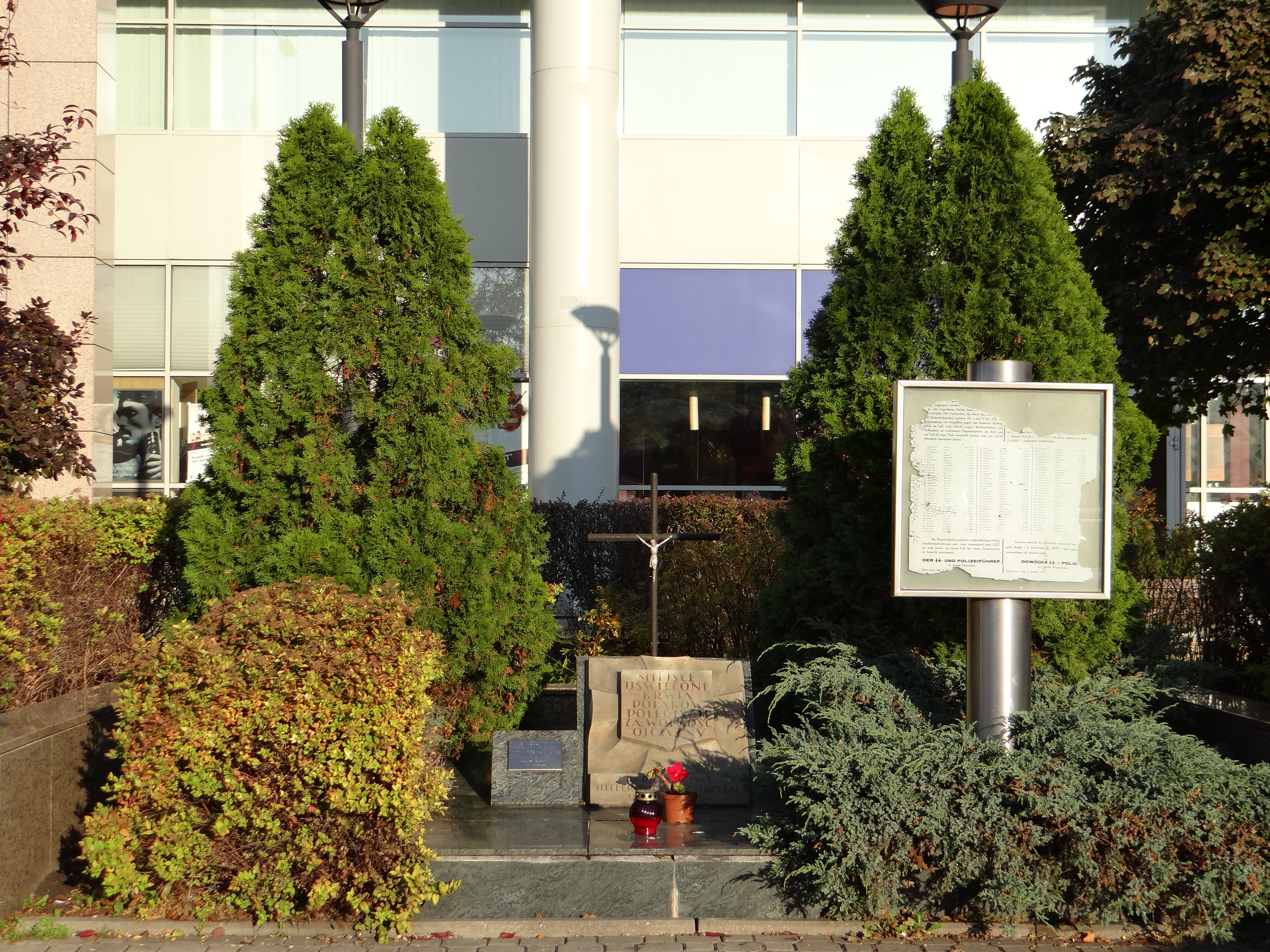
Plaque commemorating the execution of hostages at 13 Puławska Street

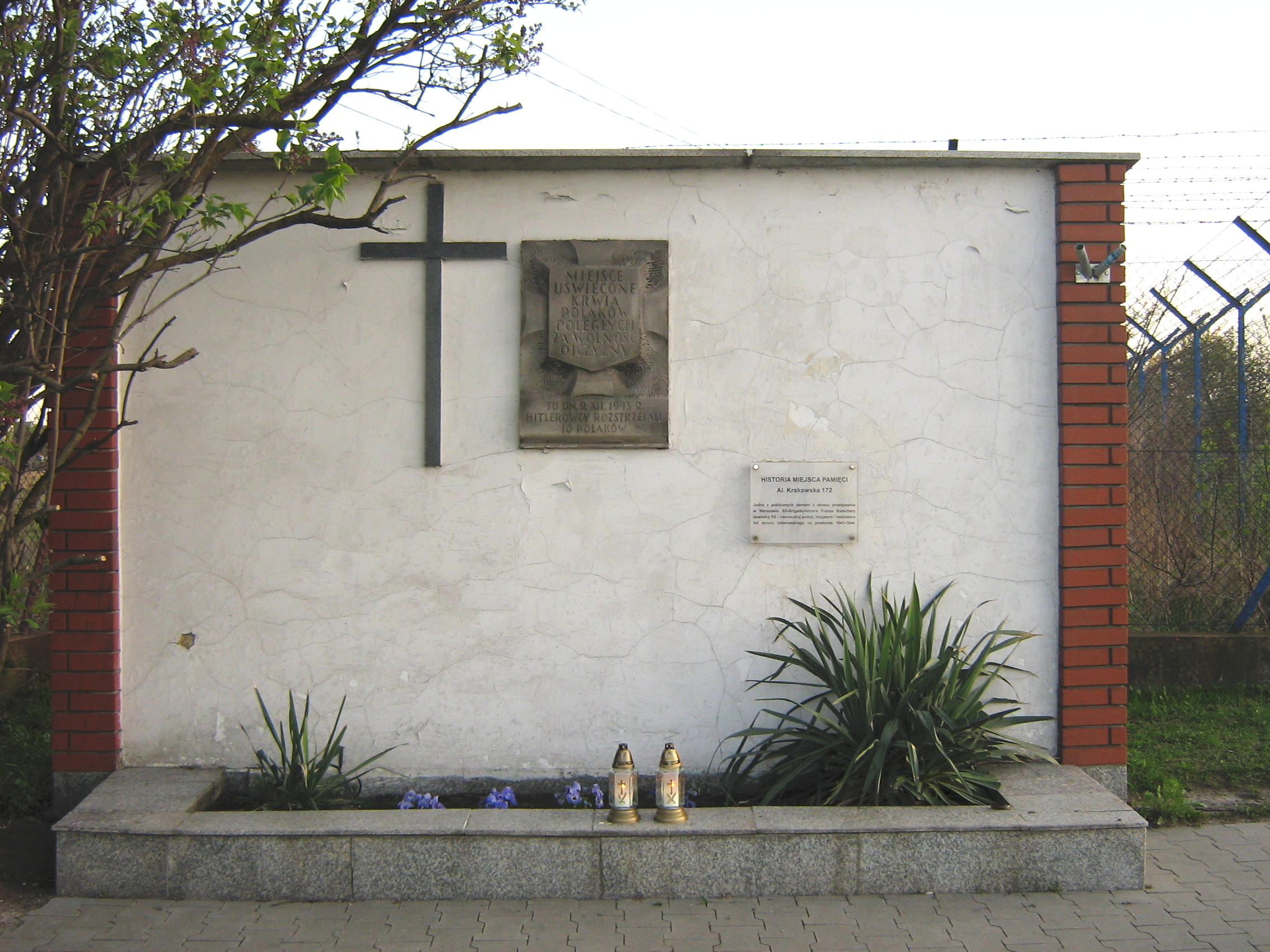
Plaque commemorating the hostages shot at Okęcie (now 172 Krakowska Avenue)

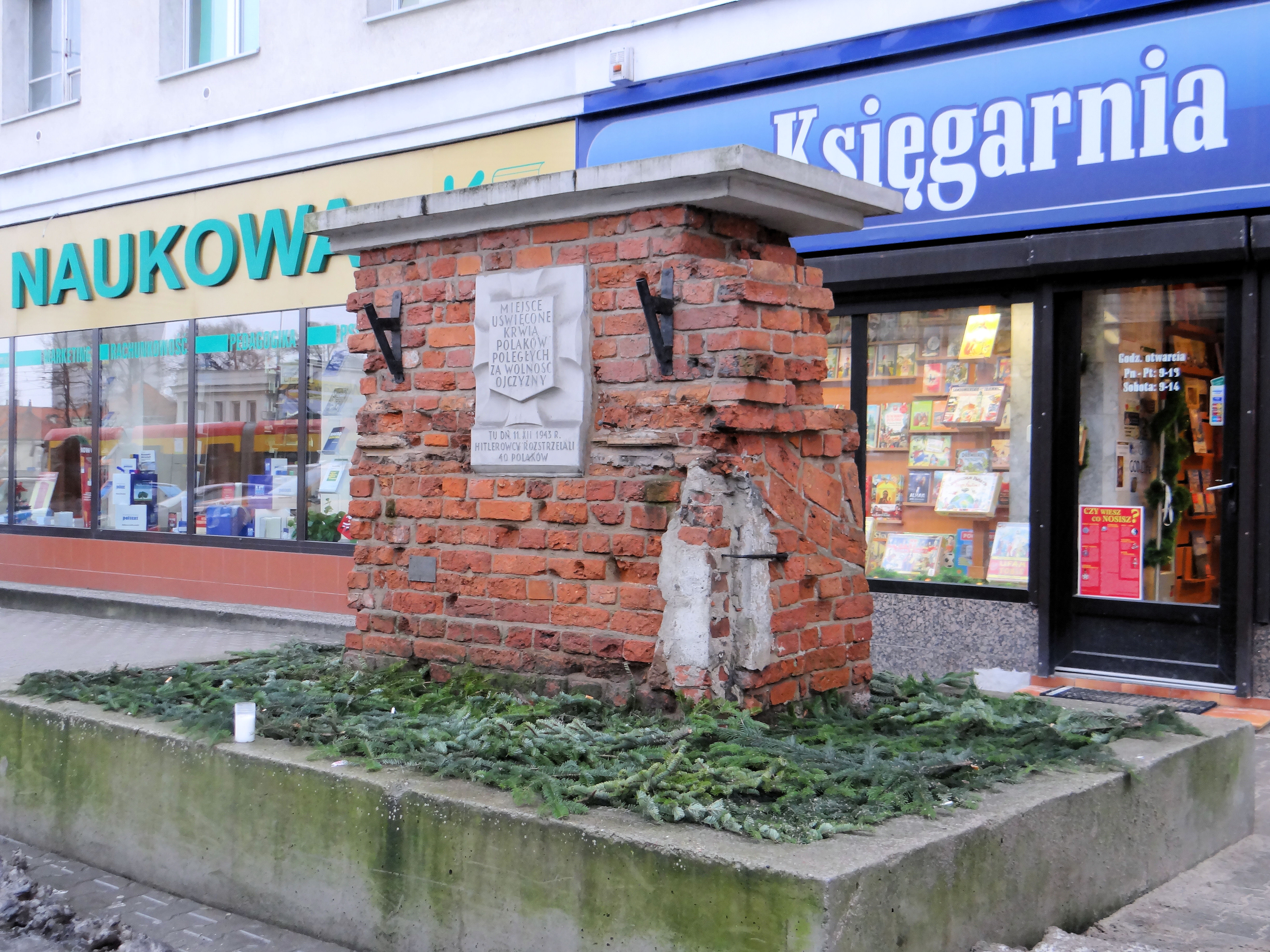
Plaque commemorating the execution of hostages at 5 Leszno Street (now 83/89 Solidarności Avenue)

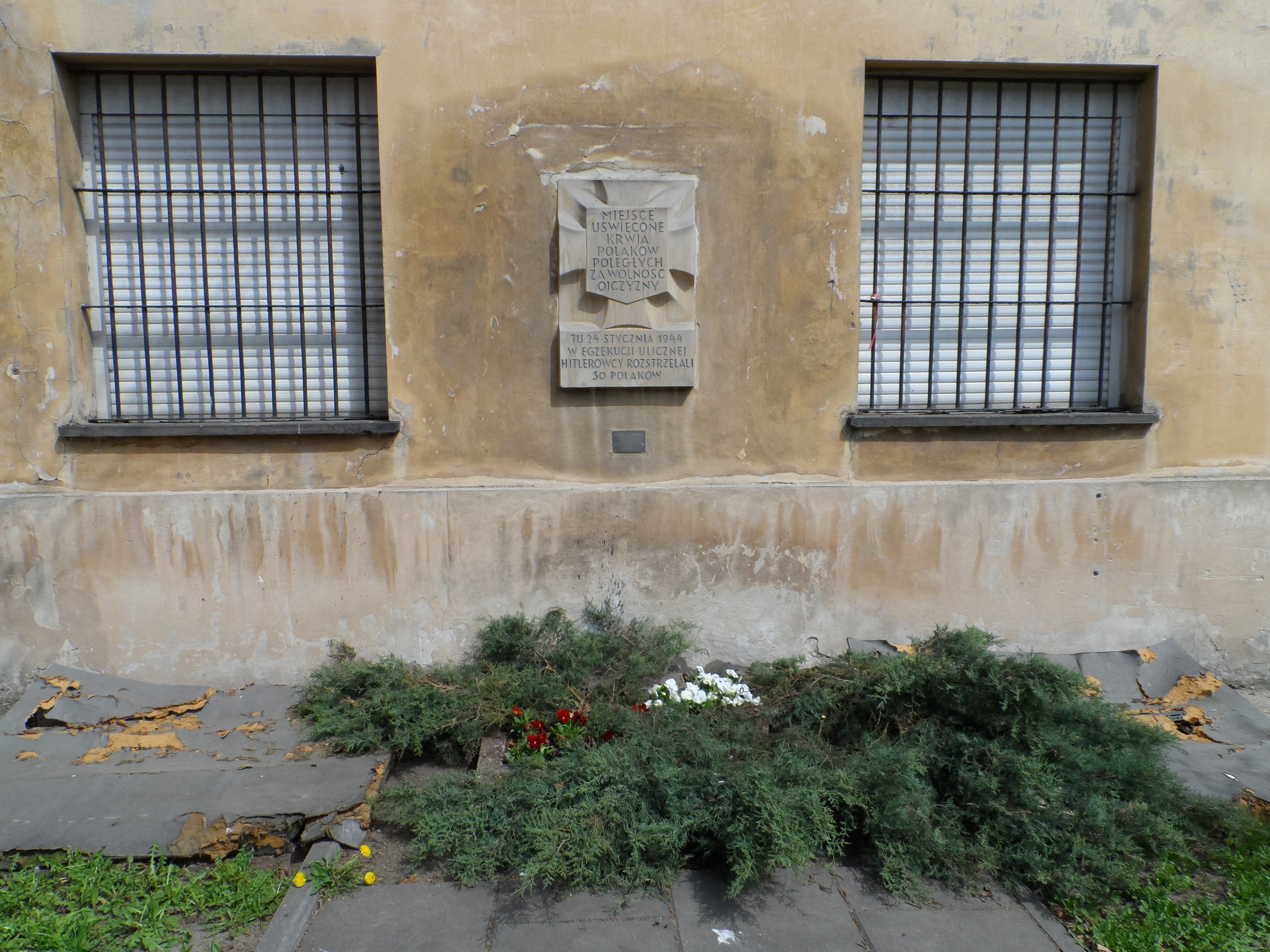
Plaque commemorating the execution of hostages by the wall of the Raczyński Palace

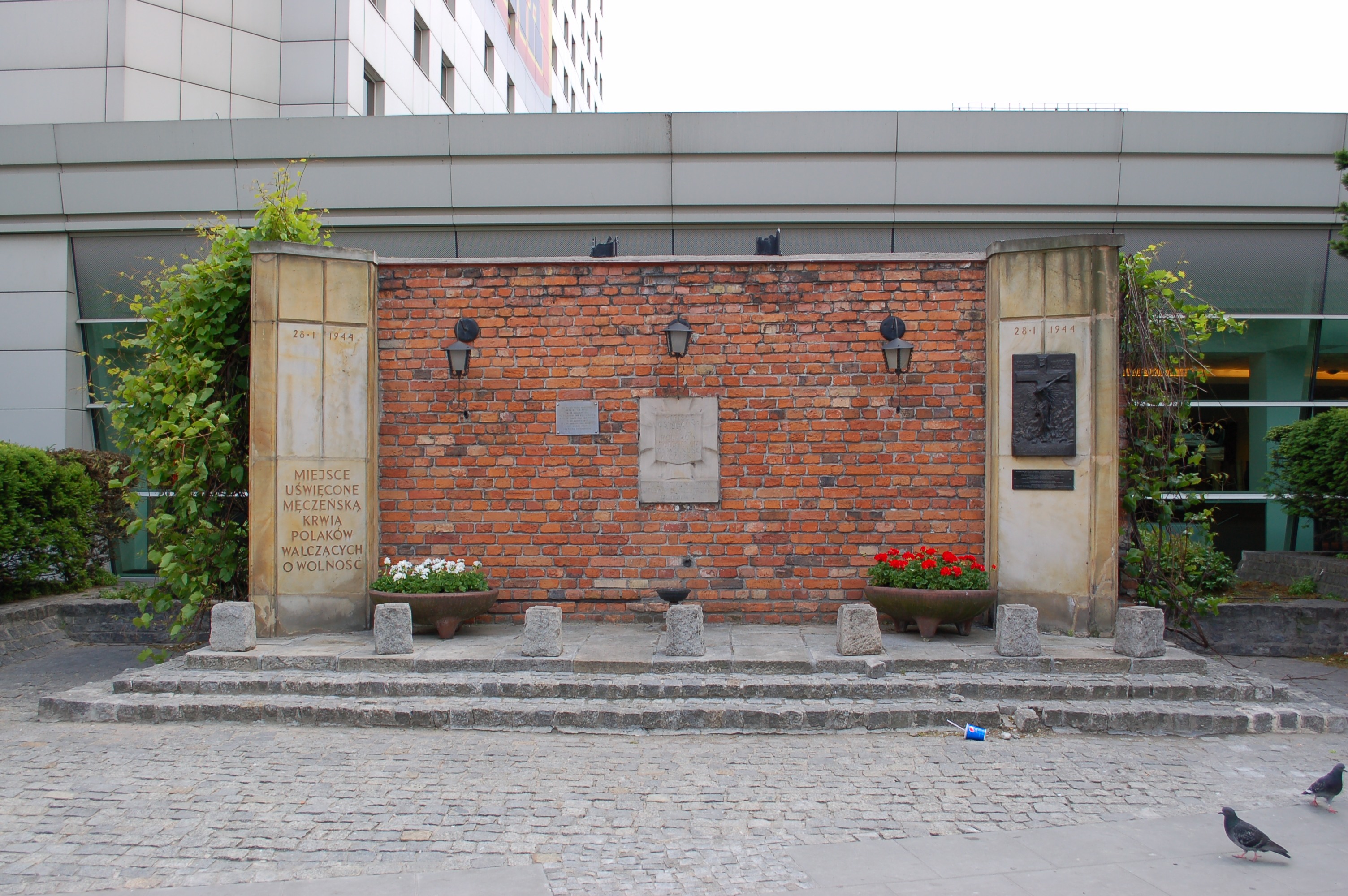
Plaque commemorating the execution of hostages at 31 Jerusalem Avenue

=== Calendar of executions ===
During the rule of Kutschera (from 25 September 1943 to 1 February 1944), the following street executions took place in Warsaw:

- October 16: at 141 Independence Avenue (between Madaliński and Różana Streets), 20 hostages brought from Pawiak were killed (one of them was Edward Olkuski, codenamed Kiliński, a member of the Wawer Organization). This was the first street execution in Warsaw, initiating Kutschera's "hard course" towards the Poles.
- October 17: by the wall near the Telephone Directorate building at 17 Pius XI Street (the so-called small PAST), 20 hostages were shot.
- October 19: the Germans were supposed to shoot about 20 Pawiak prisoners (including five women) on Inflancka Street. This information is in Regina Domańska's work, but Władysław Bartoszewski's works do not mention it.
- October 20: near the embankment of the viaduct by the Warszawa Gdańska railway station, 20 hostages were shot. According to Regina Domańska's findings, another street execution was carried out that day. Ten people were supposed to be shot by the Józef Piłsudski University of Physical Education in Bielany (no mention in Władysław Bartoszewski's works).
- October 22: at 2 Młynarska Street (corner of Wolska Street), 17 hostages brought from Pawiak were shot (the German announcement listed the names of 10 victims). A few hours later, a German patrol shot two women praying at the execution site.
- October 23: on Wał Miedzeszyński Street, about 20 Poles (including a woman and a boy in a school uniform) were shot. German posts by the Poniatowski Bridge later fired at Warsaw residents gathering at the execution site.
- October 26: by the wall at 3 Leszno Street (corner of Rymarska Street), the Germans shot about 30 Polish hostages, including probably two women.
- October 27: the Germans were supposed to shoot about 10 Polish hostages at Koło. This information is in Regina Domańska's work and Ludwik Landau's notes. Władysław Bartoszewski's works do not mention it.
- October 30: at the corner of Towarowa and Łucka streets, 10 Pawiak prisoners were executed. After the police left, a group of people gathered there, and speeches were supposedly given.
- November 9: two street executions took place – at the corner of Grójecka and Wawelska streets in Ochota and at 2 Płocka Street in Wola. According to German data, 20 people were shot in each of these executions. Among the victims were Julian Bohdanowicz (editor of the underground magazine Polsce służ, pre-war director of the Municipal School of Decorative Arts and Painting in Warsaw) and three women.
- November 12: at least two street executions took place. The first was near the building at 49 New World Street (opposite the Savoy Hotel). 20 people were shot there. The second execution took place in Praga, at the corner of Kępna and Jagiellońska streets (30 victims). According to Regina Domańska's findings, another 20 hostages were shot at the corner of Wolska and Marcin Kasprzak streets in Wola (no mention in Władysław Bartoszewski's works). About 70 Poles might have been killed in these three executions (the German announcement listed the names of 60 executed). Among the victims were Zdzisław Dudek (doctor of philosophy, sociologist, member of the Union of Polish Syndicalists), Jan Góra (lawyer and banker from Katowice, administrative director of the Třinec Iron and Steel Works), Józef Miernik (organizer of underground education, pre-war director of Municipal High School No. 3 in Warsaw), Tadeusz Szuster (Home Army communications officer), and Andrzej Trzebiński (poet, essayist, and playwright associated with the Sztuka i Naród group). The execution on New World Street, carried out in the city's center, made a significant impression on the capital's residents.
- November 17: two street executions took place – at Kopińska Street (near the railway embankment by the Warszawa Zachodnia station) and Białołęcka Street in Praga. The German announcement listed the names of 43 executed. According to information from the underground cell in Pawiak, however, 80 prisoners (including five women) were taken to be executed that day. Some of the victims might have been killed in the ruins of the ghetto.
- November 24: two street executions took place. The first was at 18 Nabielaka Street (corner of Belwederska Street) in Mokotów, where 10 hostages were shot. The second was at the tram terminus on Radzymińska Street (Praga), where 17 people were shot. Among the murdered were Major Jerzy Lewiński, codenamed Chuchro (commander of the Kedyw Warsaw District) and Dr. Ludwik Goryński (psychologist, academic at the University of Warsaw, head of the Polish Red Cross Youth Counseling Center). Along with Dr. Goryński, his wife Dr. Ewa Rybicka-Goryńska (scout activist, psychologist, lecturer in psychology at the underground University of Warsaw, Home Army soldier), his mother Maria Goryńska, and his father-in-law Kazimierz Rybicki (agricultural engineer) were also killed.
- November 30: at 63 Solec Street, near the Holy Trinity Church, dozens of hostages brought from Pawiak were executed. Rumors in Warsaw suggested that the execution was carried out during a church service. The German announcement listed the names of 34 executed. According to information from the underground cell in Pawiak, however, 60 prisoners (including five women) were taken to be executed that day, with some killed in the ruins of the ghetto. Among the victims were Halina Stabrowska (secretary to the Home Army Commander-in-Chief, General Tadeusz Bór-Komorowski) and Dr. Tadeusz Wiśniewski (botanist, bryologist, phytogeographer, academic at the University of Warsaw).
- December 2: by the wall of a burnt house at 64 New World Street, a group of men brought from Pawiak was shot. This execution was exceptionally carried out in front of passersby, detained by police cordons between Ordynacka and Krakowskie Przedmieście streets. The German announcement later listed the names of 34 executed. According to information from the underground cell in Pawiak, about 50 people were taken to be executed that day. Among the murdered were painters Janusz Zoller and Stanisław Haykowski. The execution, carried out in the city's center, made a significant impression on the capital's residents.
- December 3: in the courtyard of the burnt house at 21/23 Puławska Street and next to the tram depot at 13 Puławska Street, the Germans conducted a mass execution of Polish hostages. The German announcement listed the names of 100 executed. According to information from the underground cell in Pawiak, however, 112 men were taken to be executed that day. Among the victims were Professor Stefan Bryła (professor at the Warsaw University of Technology, member of the Polish Parliament), Stanisław Siezieniewski (actor and director of theaters in Vilnius and Łódź), and Henryk Trzonek (musician, head of the Polskie Radio string quartet). The hostages were shot in retaliation for an attack on German police carried out in this location the previous day by soldiers of Kedyw.
- December 9: two street executions were supposed to take place in which 50 people were killed. According to Regina Domańska's findings, they were carried out in Okęcie (now 172 Krakowska Avenue) and in Wola. In each of these executions, 25 men were supposed to have died. The German announcement listed the names of 27 executed (there is no mention of these executions in Władysław Bartoszewski's works). On the other hand, testimonies of direct witnesses of the execution in Okęcie indicate that about 10 Pawiak prisoners were executed by machine gun fire that day. The Germans also forced from 60 to 70 residents of nearby houses to watch the execution. The bodies of the executed were taken towards Sękocin.
- December 11: between 27 and 30 men brought from Pawiak were executed near the house at 5 Leszno Street. They were executed near the place where an execution took place on October 26.
- December 14: about 300 men were taken from Pawiak for execution. About 70 convicts were shot in a street execution at 9/11 Wierzbowa Street (near Theatre Square). Over 100 men and one woman were shot at the wall of the ghetto at Bonifraterska Street (from the inside). Although this second execution took place inside the closed zone of the former ghetto, it was visible from the windows of neighboring buildings (e.g., from the windows of the John of God Hospital), and until it was over, the Germans blocked Bonifraterska and adjacent streets (stopping tram traffic). The remaining convicts mentioned in Pawiak reports were secretly executed in the ruins of the ghetto. The German announcement later included a list of 270 executed (this also included the names of hostages executed in secret and street executions on December 11, so it was underestimated by at least 110 victims compared to the actual number of Poles executed on those days). The massacre was carried out in retaliation for Home Army combat actions – the blowing up of a German train near Celestynów and the successful assassination of Emil Braun, the head of the Municipal Housing Office in Warsaw.
- December 18: there was a street execution at 77 Wolska Street (corner of Syrena Street). That day, 47 men and 10 women were taken from Pawiak for execution. However, it was not possible to determine how many hostages were shot in the street execution and how many were secretly murdered in the ruins of the ghetto.
- December 23: a group of Pawiak prisoners was shot at 14 Górczewska Street (corner of Płocka Street). The German announcement listed the names of 43 executed. However, information from the underground cell in Pawiak indicated that 52 men and a few women were taken to death that day (some of whom were executed in the ruins of the ghetto).
- December 31: several dozen Pawiak prisoners were shot at 4 Towarowa Street. The German announcement later listed the names of 43 murdered. One of the victims was Ludomir Marczak – a composer and socialist activist who was arrested for hiding Jews.
- January 13: a group of hostages brought from Pawiak was again shot at 14 Górczewska Street (corner of Płocka). The German announcement later listed the names of 200 executed, while reports from the underground cell in Pawiak spoke of between 300 and 500 people being executed. Most of the victims were secretly murdered in the ruins of the ghetto. In the street execution at Górczewska Street, about 40 hostages were probably shot. Possibly killed at this place was pre-war film and theater actor Zygmunt Biesiadecki. The massacre was carried out in retaliation for Home Army combat actions, including an unsuccessful assassination attempt on Nazi Party and Gestapo dignitaries carried out on the Warsaw–Mińsk Mazowiecki road (Operation Polowanie).
- January 24: 69 men and 8 women were taken from Pawiak for execution. About 50 men were shot in a street execution at the corner of Jan Kiliński and Długa streets (by the wall of the Raczyński Palace). The remaining hostages were executed in the ruins of the ghetto. One of the prisoners murdered that day was probably Tytus Czaki (former president of Brest and Włocławek, member of the Combat Organization of the Polish Socialist Party and the Riflemen's Association).
- January 28: a group of Pawiak prisoners was shot at 31 Jerusalem Avenue, near the intersection with Marszałkowska Street. The execution took place in the very center of Warsaw and made a particularly shocking impression on the city's population. The German announcement later listed the names of 102 executed, while reports from the underground cell in Pawiak indicated that about 200 prisoners were executed. Witness testimonies, however, indicate that in the street execution in Jerusalem Avenue, probably about 20–30 hostages were murdered. The rest were secretly executed in the ruins of the ghetto. Among the Poles murdered that day were: Gustaw Józef Bobowski (captain of the Polish Armed Forces), Marian Bogiel (artist painter), Władysław Krassowski (clerk), Włodzimierz Siwek (arrested for helping Jews), and Stanisław Gibas, Antoni Stępniak, and Bolesław Zuchowicz (teachers from the Łowicz County).

Street executions, strongly affecting emotions and imagination, naturally attracted public attention. However, the extermination campaign carried out in parallel in the ruins of the Warsaw Ghetto took on a much larger scale. During Kutschera's rule, there was practically no day without secret murders in the area of the former Jewish residential district. In mass executions, even hundreds of people were shot at once – usually ordinary Warsaw residents caught during street roundups. As a result, the number of hostages secretly murdered in the ruins of the ghetto far exceeded the number of street execution victims.

In addition, during Kutschera's rule, executions of hostages brought from the capital took place several times in the streets of suburban towns. On 18 November 1943, a group of 20 Pawiak prisoners was shot in Grodzisk Mazowiecki. On the same day, 20 people brought from Warsaw were also executed in Żyrardów. On November 20, another 20 hostages were shot in Otwock. On December 20, between 20 and 40 men brought from Pawiak were shot at 1 Rawska Street in Skierniewice (corner of the Market Square).

=== Reaction of Polish society ===
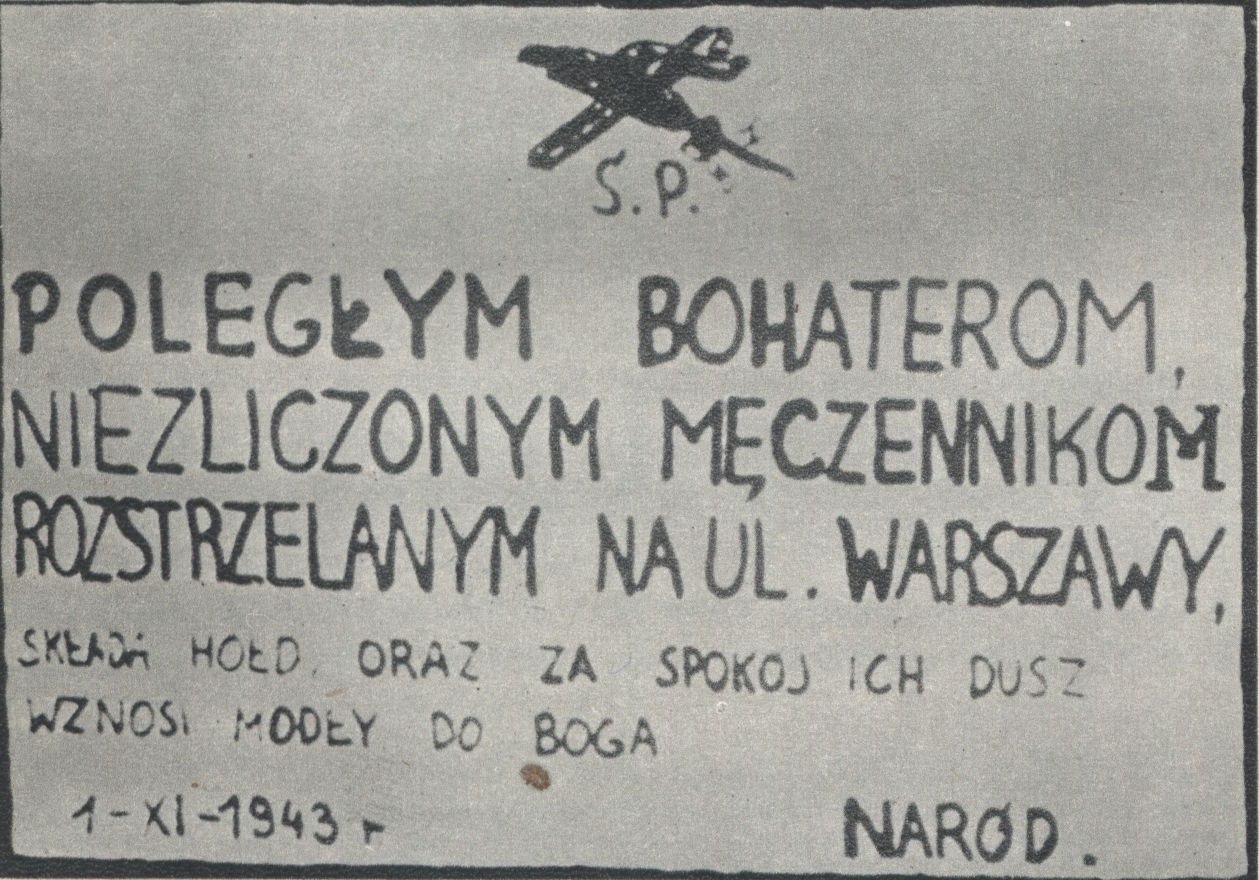
Plaque erected by anonymous Warsaw residents at one of the execution sites (All Saints' Day, 1943)

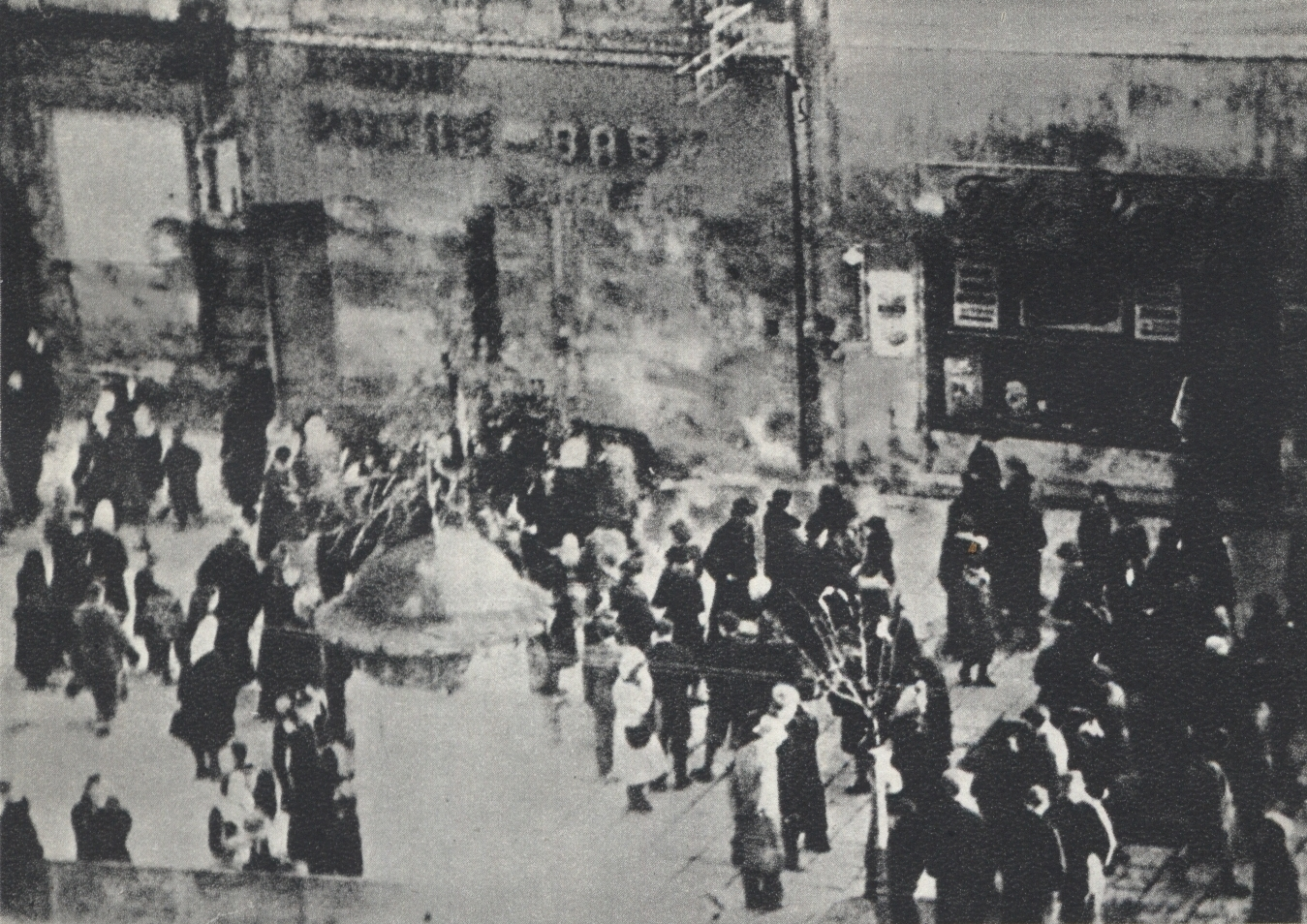
Warsaw residents gathering at the site of the execution at 31 Jerusalem Avenue (28 January 1944)

The street executions had a shocking impact on the residents of Warsaw. While previously, German repressions were generally aimed at specific social or political groups, the terror introduced by Kutschera was applied almost indiscriminately. Alongside political prisoners arrested by the Gestapo, ordinary Warsaw residents, randomly caught during street round-ups, were being killed en masse. Under these circumstances, no city resident could be certain of their life, and every venture outside the home became a journey into the unknown. The Biuletyn Informacyjny of 28 October 1943 reported: Life in the city has been disrupted from its usual course, everyone minimizes their movements, and the operation of offices and businesses is in question. The Government Delegation for Poland reported to the Polish authorities in London in their September and October 1943 report that street traffic in Warsaw had significantly decreased, with residents avoiding trams, commuter trains, railway stations, and those areas of the city where round-ups were most severe. Ludwik Landau, a chronicler of occupied Warsaw, noted in his diary on 20 October 1943: The mood is full of terror. Comparisons to what the Germans did to the Jews are repeatedly made: is that what awaits us? On October 25, he further noted: Anyone who can, stays at home, and when they go out, they run across the streets in fear. At the slightest sound of a motor vehicle, panic ensues.

As a result of the drastic escalation of German terror, the mood of the Polish society significantly deteriorated. The lack of response from the Allies to the atrocities committed by the Germans was also received very negatively. The Government Delegation for Poland indicated that in the country, increasingly strong feelings of doubt and bitterness are beginning to prevail, caused by the lack of any reaction, immediate assistance for Poland in the form of retaliation against the Germans […] The country is reaching the limit of its strength and nerve endurance (report of 24 October 1943). Delegate Jan Stanisław Jankowski reported that the drastic escalation of occupation terror – combined with news of the stalled Allied offensive in Italy and the silence of Allied propaganda about German crimes – caused a crisis of confidence in the Allies. The 18 December 1943 report from the Delegation was even more alarming. Its authors warned that: extremely dangerous political moods are beginning to awaken in the country: for the first time since the beginning of the occupation, faint whispers are starting to circulate through the exhausted, tormented, and depleted society, questioning: is our political strategy right, should we continue the current forms of Polish resistance and counteraction against the occupier. Disillusionment and doubt are starting to creep into the ranks of society. Ludwik Landau's notes also confirm the worsening social mood. Referring to German notices about hostage executions, he observed: Calling for denunciations will have no effect; only scoundrels, who don't need invitations, are capable of that. But this action does not pass without a trace insofar as it stirs quite widespread dissatisfaction with all forms of fighting against the Germans, seeing in them the reason for the rampant terror.

Ultimately, however, the Germans failed to break the will of Polish society to resist. Once the initial shock passed, the mass executions increased hatred towards the occupier and provoked retaliatory actions by the Polish underground. They also reinforced the belief that the Germans' goal was the biological extermination of the Polish nation, contributing to the unification of society against the occupiers. Furthermore, the indiscriminate terror had the opposite effect than intended, as it did not deter people from cooperating with the resistance but instead reduced their reservations. Ludwik Landau noted that fighting the occupier was no longer seen as particularly dangerous because everyone is at risk, regardless of whether they do something or not. The people of Warsaw also gradually became accustomed to the constant round-ups and executions. The aforementioned Delegation report for September and October 1943 assessed that it does not seem at all like Warsaw will calm down, as the Germans hoped from this action […] Warsaw is controlling its nerves and enduring German terror with quite a large degree of calmness, though in a mood of depression and heavy concern. The underground press noted that Warsaw residents, without any encouragement from the underground, gathered in large numbers at execution sites, laying flowers, lighting candles, and saying prayers. (Note: Biuletyn Informacyjny of 28 October 1943 reported: After the initial days of lost psychological balance, Polish society is returning to a firm determination. The magnificent spontaneous gestures of reverence by the capital at the sites of street executions will forever remain marvelous proofs of the compassionate, heroic spirit of the city's people (Szarota (2010, p. 462)).) The dignified demeanor of the victims also inspired widespread admiration. Halina Krahelska wrote:

Public executions, terrible in their staging and unprecedented cruelty, did not cause a single instance of breakdown, humiliation, or begging for mercy. The condemned, in their paper shirts and with mouths sealed with plaster, died bravely.

In the German occupation apparatus, opinions varied on the effectiveness of Kutschera's tactics. The horror caused by the mass round-ups and street executions in Warsaw was so great that there were concerns it might negatively impact the productivity of German enterprises in the city, thus harming the German war effort. There was also a recognition that street executions gave Poles an opportunity for patriotic demonstrations. Wilhelm Ohlenbusch, the head of the propaganda department in the General Government, proposed designating isolated places for executions, pointing out that the Polish population gathered at execution sites and then scooped the blood-soaked earth into containers and brought it to church. However, the Governor of the Warsaw District, Ludwig Fischer, was satisfied with Kutschera's actions. In his report for October and November 1943 (signed 15 December 1943), he reported: The SS and police commander applied severe retaliatory measures. For each attack, a larger number of Poles were shot on the spot. As a result of such severe measures, the number of attacks decreased significantly in November, at least in Warsaw. Also, the number of murders decreased significantly compared to October (15 murders compared to 78). In his report for December 1943 and January 1944 (dated 10 February 1944), he noted: It can be stated that as a result of such severe measures, the number of murders committed against Germans during the reporting period decreased significantly. In December 1943, 50 Germans were murdered, and in January 1944 only five […] The number of attacks in the Warsaw District also decreased significantly […] This overall improvement in security is largely the result of the severe but necessary measures taken by the SS and police commander – SS-Brigadeführer and Major General of Police Kutschera in consultation with me.

=== Retaliatory actions of the resistance ===
The crimes committed by the occupiers were met with armed responses from the Polish underground. These responses generally followed three main directions. Firstly, the Kedyw (Directorate of Diversion) of the Warsaw District of the Home Army carried out a series of strikes targeting the German protective police, the formation whose officers most often conducted round-ups and street executions. At the same time, the special Kedyw unit of the Home Army's Main Command, Agat Company, continued assassinations of selected representatives of the German occupation apparatus, while other Kedyw units of the Main Command and the Warsaw District focused on actions against German military transport.

On 22 October 1943, soldiers of the Praga Sappers Battalion of the Home Army ambushed German police cars on New World Street and attacked a Schutzpolizei post on Targowa Street in Praga. The next day, the communist People's Guard carried out an attack on the Bar Podlaski restaurant at 15 Nowogrodzka Street, corner of Krucza Street (a place designated Nur für Deutsche and intended for SS and police officers). On the night of October 23/24, Home Army soldiers conducted a series of retaliatory attacks on German railway transport, blowing up or derailing German trains in the vicinity of Płochocin, Śródborów, and Tłuszcz. On October 24, Home Army soldiers conducted two more actions against the German protective police, this time in the area of Targowa and Ząbkowska streets in Praga.

On November 22, soldiers of the 1st Company of the Zośka Battalion blew up a German express train traveling from Warsaw to Berlin near Szymanów. At the turn of November and December, the Home Army carried out a series of attacks against the German police in Warsaw. On November 26, soldiers of the Praga Sappers Battalion attacked police cars again at the intersection of New World and Ordynacka streets, while soldiers of the A Operational Unit of the Warsaw District Kedyw struck at German police cars crossing the Poniatowski Bridge near Solec Street. More attacks followed on December 2. On that day, soldiers of the 19th Combat Diversion Unit of the Mokotów Subdistrict and soldiers of the Praga Sappers Battalion attacked German police cars at the intersection of Puławska and Rakowiecka streets and on the Wybrzeże Gdańskie Street. A few days later, operations against the Warsaw Schutzpolizei were halted by an order from the commander of the Warsaw District, Colonel Antoni Chruściel, codenamed Monter.

In the first half of December, the Kedyw operational unit of the Warsaw District, under the command of Second Lieutenant Józef Czuma, codenamed Skryty, conducted successful attacks on German express trains near Skruda (December 4) and Celestynów (December 11/12). Additionally, in November and December, the Home Army and the People's Guard carried out several other actions against German railway transport.

== Death of Kutschera and its consequences ==
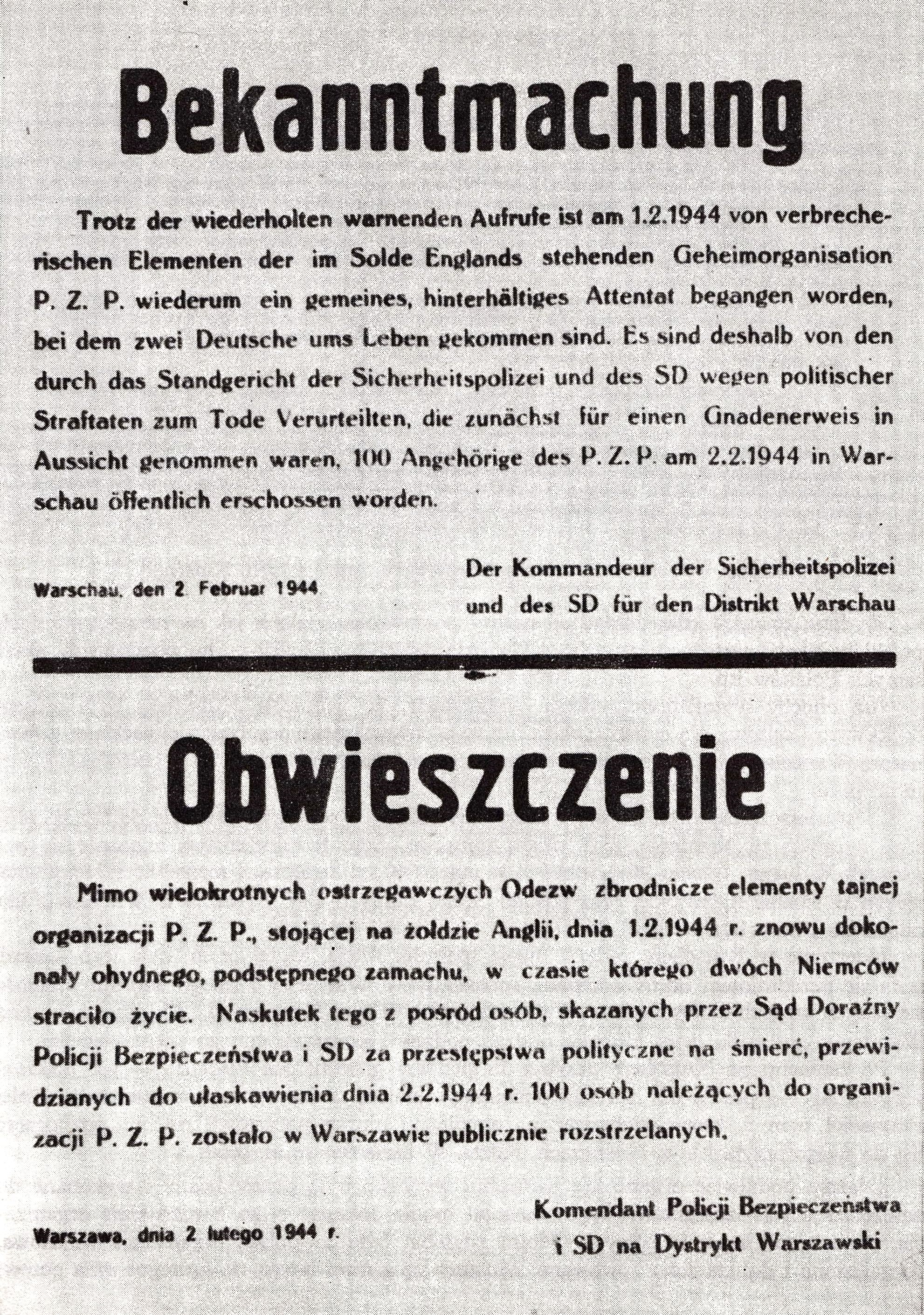
Announcement of the execution of 100 Polish hostages on 2 February 1944

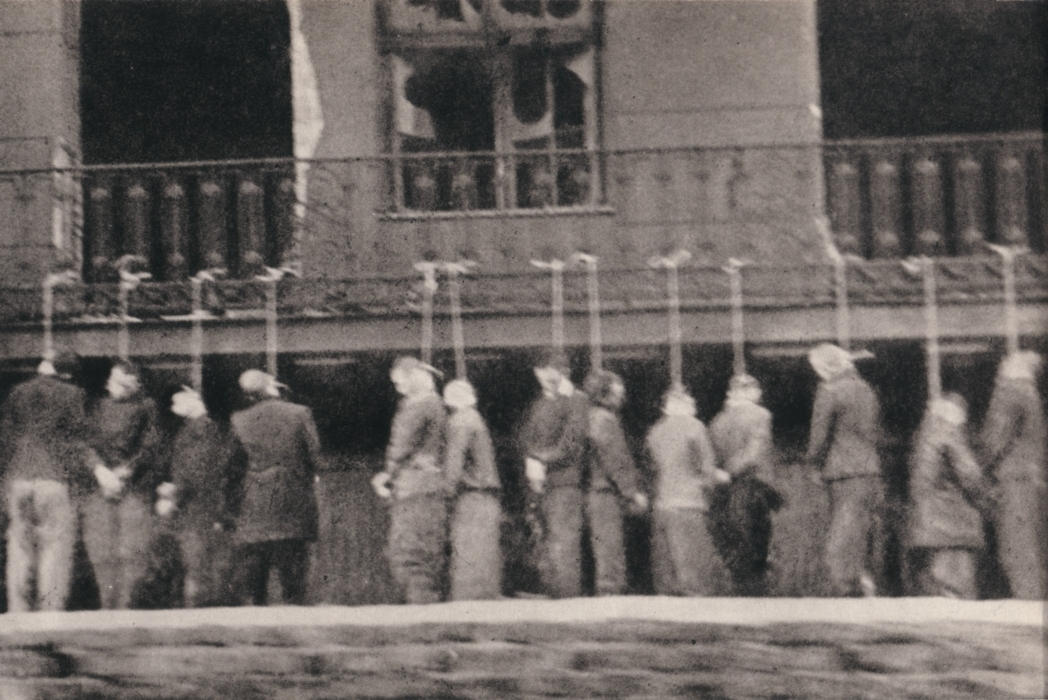
Prisoners from Pawiak hanged on Leszno Street

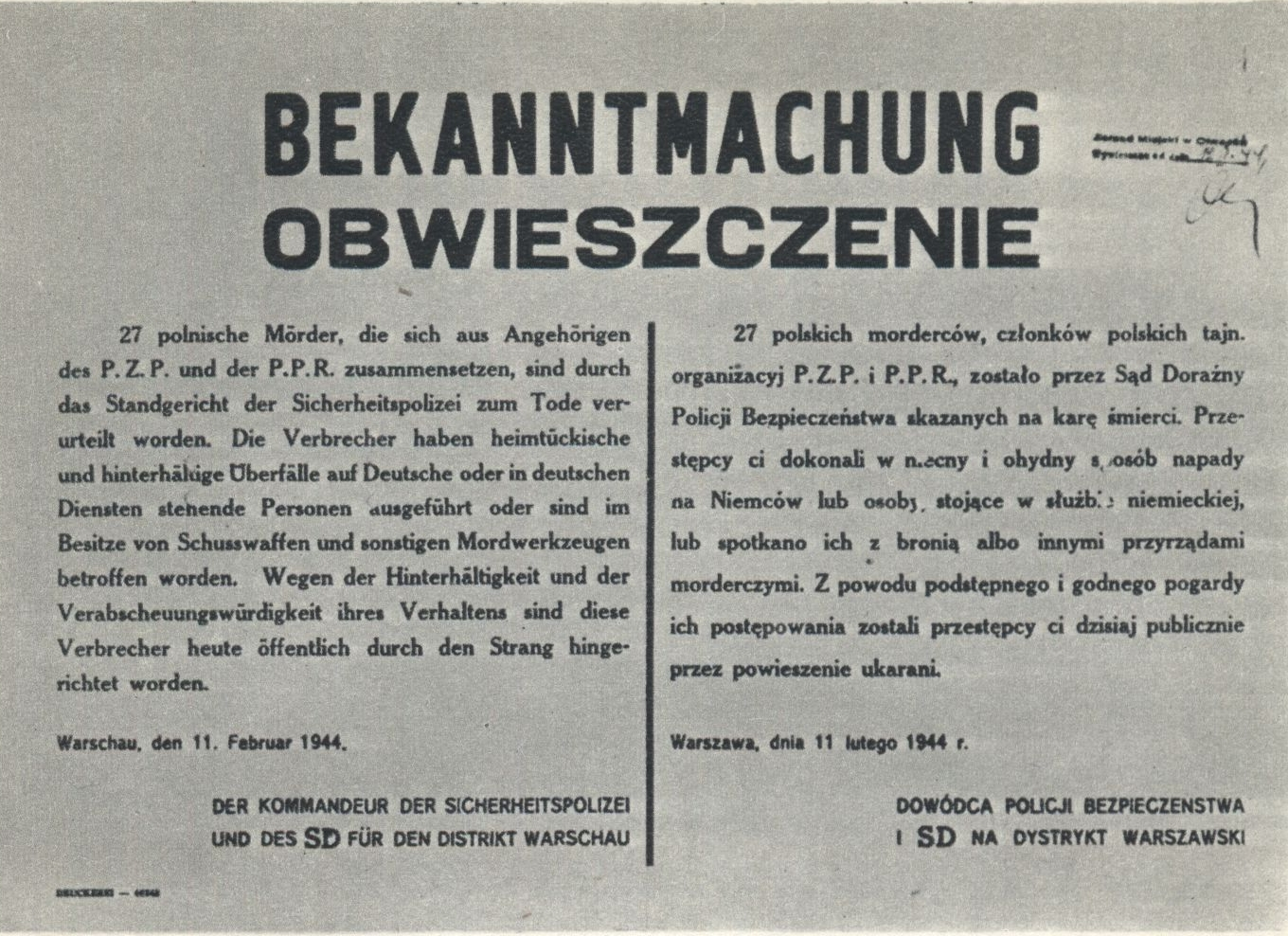
Announcement of the hanging of 27 hostages on 11 February 1944

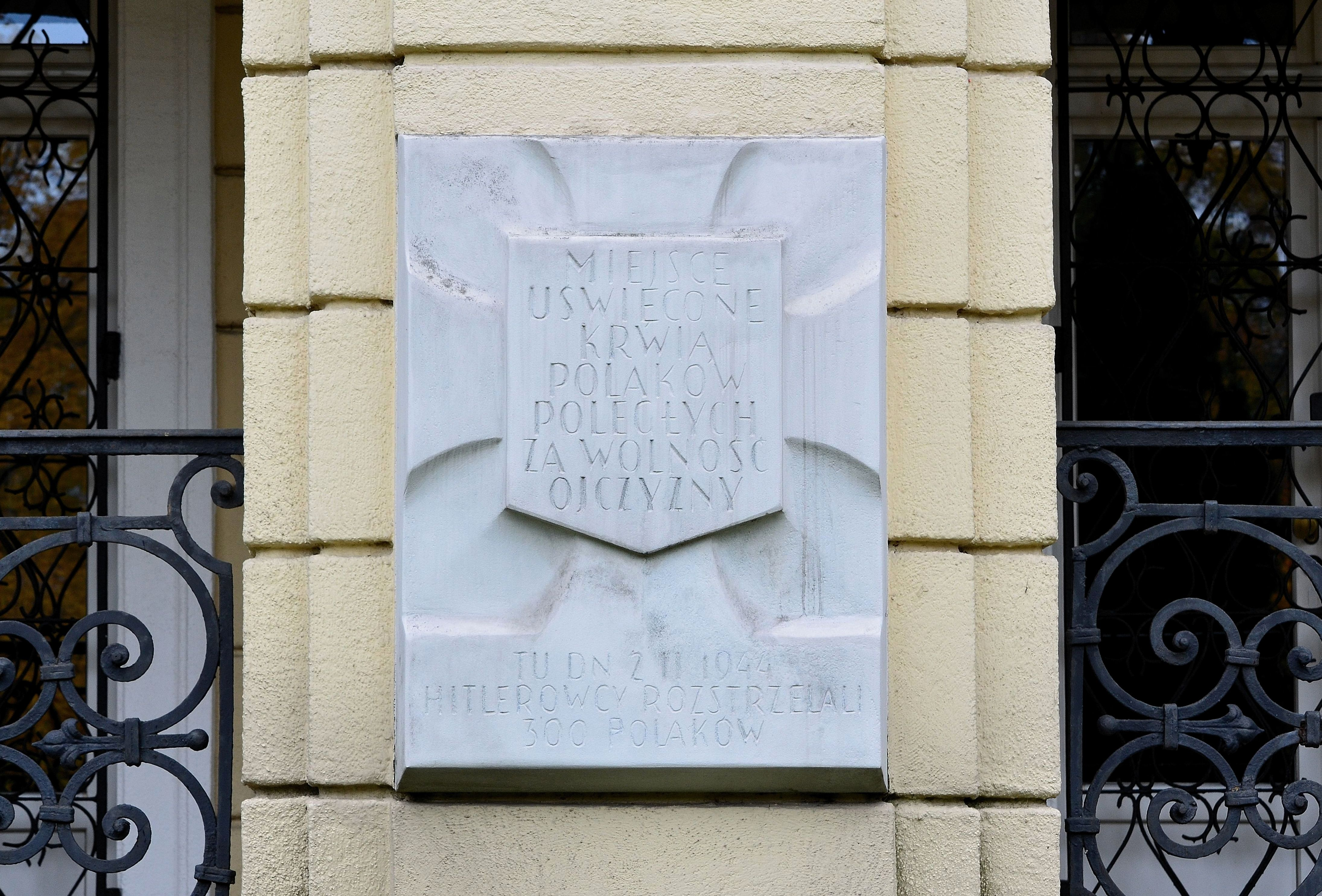
Memorial plaque for the execution of hostages at 21 Ujazdów Avenue

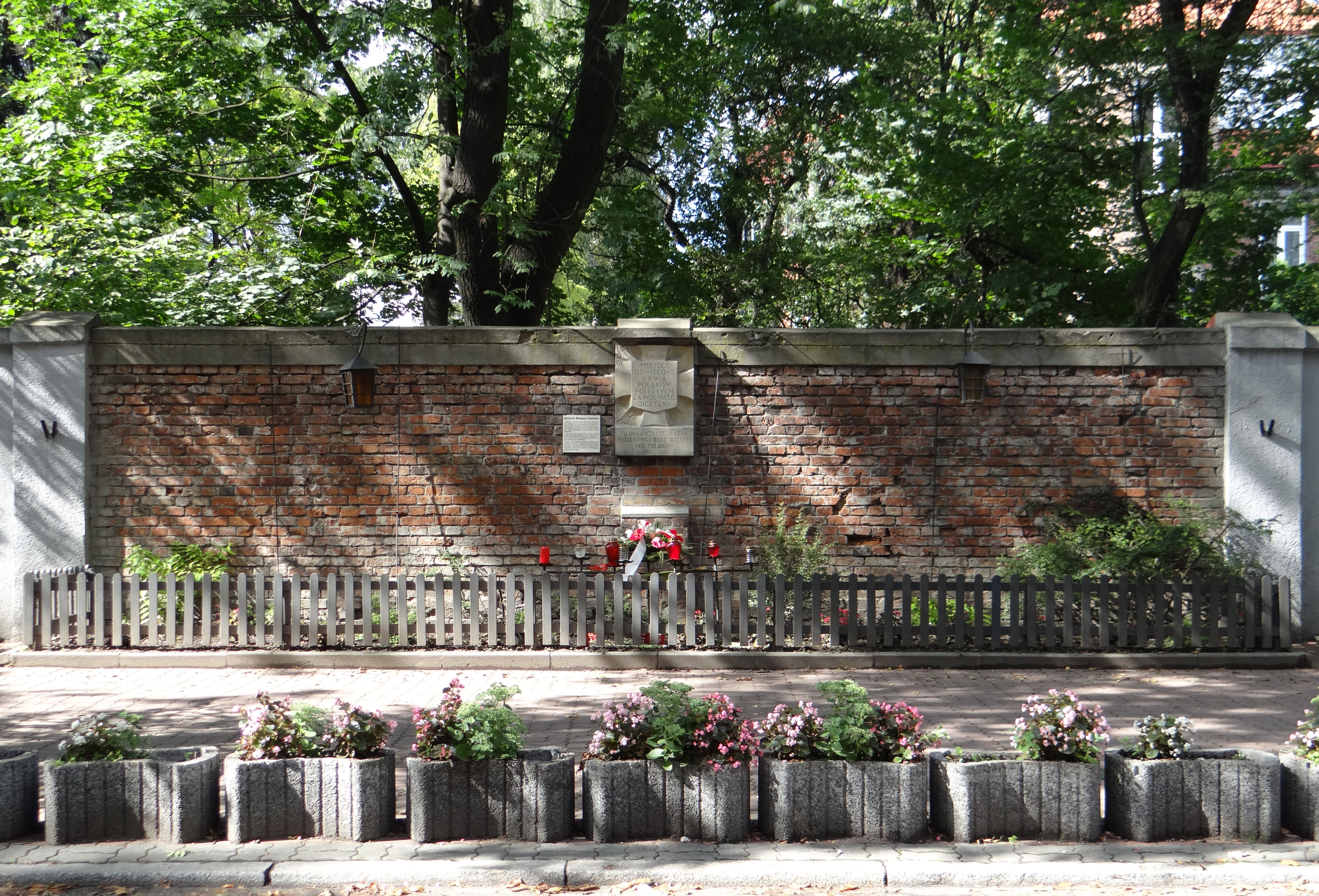
Memorial plaque for the execution of hostages at Barska Street

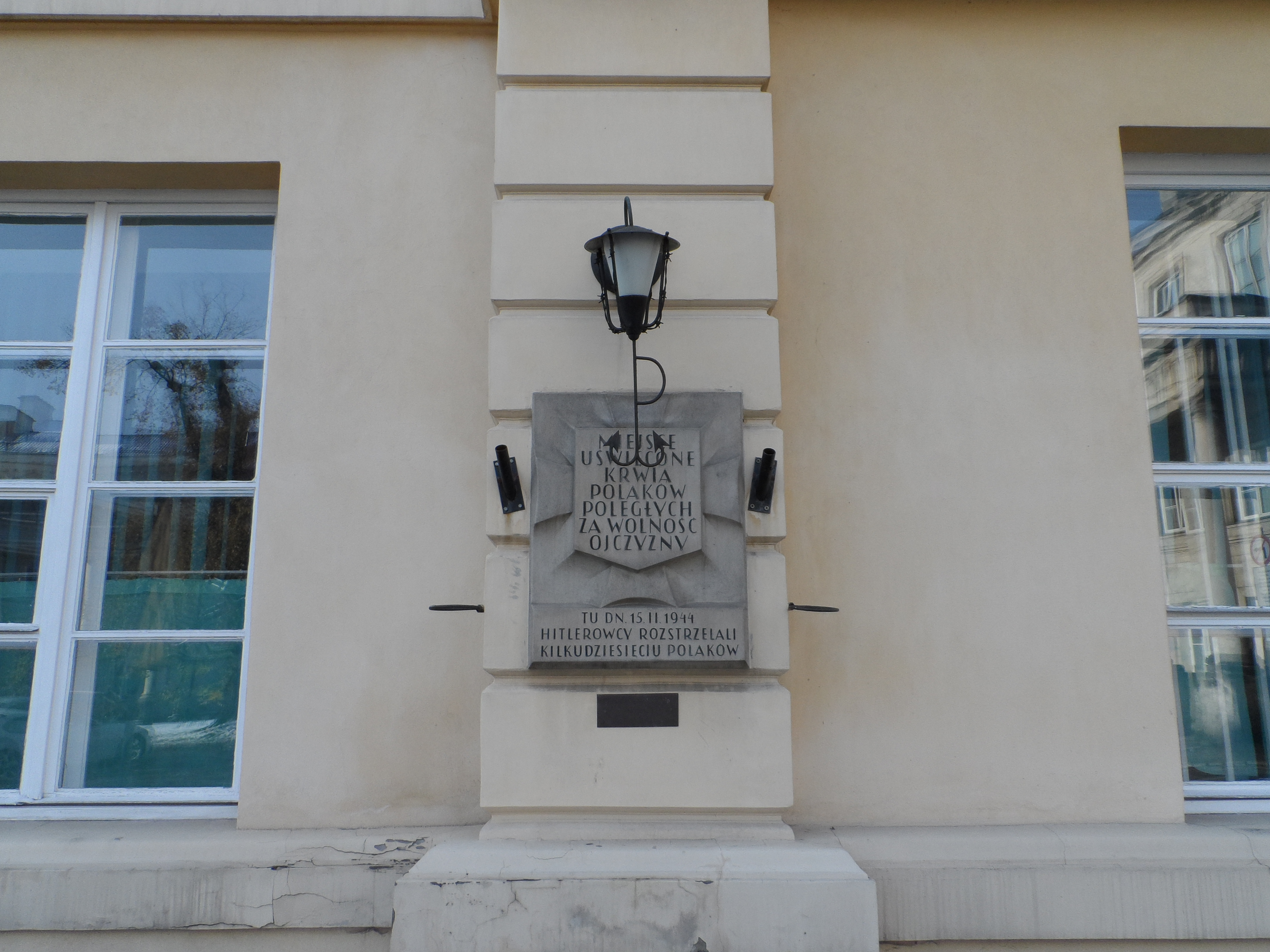
Memorial plaque for the execution of hostages at 6 Senatorska Street

German reactions to resistance actions almost always involved mass executions of hostages. In this context, the Directorate of Underground Resistance issued a death sentence on Kutschera, well-known as the driving force behind the terror policy (December 1943). Colonel Emil Fieldorf, codenamed Nil, was responsible for carrying out the sentence. On 1 February 1944, soldiers of the Pegaz unit (formerly known as Agat) successfully assassinated the SS and police leader of the Warsaw District in Ujazdów Avenue.

In retaliation for Kutschera's death, the Germans executed 300 Poles the next day. 100 hostages were killed in a street execution at the corner of Ujazdów Avenue and Chopin Street (near the assassination site), and the remaining 200 were executed in the ruins of the ghetto. Warsaw and the surrounding areas were subjected to a fine of 100 million PLN (with 85 million PLN imposed on Warsaw itself). The curfew was also moved up to 7:00 PM. For the first time since autumn 1943, the occupiers refrained from publicly listing the names of those executed.

After Kutschera's death, Warsaw experienced another wave of searches and arrests. The Gestapo and German police cordoned off entire apartment blocks, detaining all suspicious individuals. Between February 1 and 6 alone, nearly 1,800 Poles were arrested. (Note: Among those detained was a group of fifteen teenage boys who had been arrested in September 1942 on the orders of Governor Fischer. They were apprehended while playing soccer near Skolimów because Fischer, passing by, suspected they were part of a clandestine officer training school. The investigation did not confirm these suspicions, and the boys were soon released. However, their names remained in the Warsaw Gestapo files. The day after Kutschera's assassination, all fifteen were rearrested and soon after executed in one of the retaliatory executions (Szarota (2010, p. 163)).) On February 7, the Gestapo conducted hours-long searches at two institutions run by Salesian priests in Powiśle: the Orphanage of Father Siemiec (14 Lipowa Street) and the School of Graphic Arts (6 Father Siemiec Street). During these raids, 17 priests, 14 brothers, 11 staff members, and 8 orphans were arrested, with most eventually deported to Auschwitz. That same day, 15 priests and brothers from the Congregation of the Mission associated with the Holy Cross Church on Krakowskie Przedmieście Street were also arrested, many of whom were later deported to concentration camps, including Father Jan Rzymełka, the parish priest of Holy Cross Church and superior of the religious house.

On February 10, the Germans conducted two more retaliatory street executions. The first took place by the wall surrounding Church of the Immaculate Conception of the Blessed Virgin Mary on Barska Street in Ochota, and the second at 79/81 Wolska Street in Wola. The exact number of victims in these executions is unknown. A German announcement posted two days later indicated that 140 hostages had been executed that day (without listing names). However, underground reports from Pawiak suggested that around 470 people were executed between February 10 and 11, most killed secretly in the ruins of the ghetto. Lieutenant Jerzy Kleczkowski, codenamed Ryś, commander of the Warsaw team in the Osa–Kosa 30 unit, may have died in one of these street executions.

On February 11, for the first time since 1942, the Germans conducted a public execution of Pawiak prisoners. On the balconies of a burned-out building on Leszno Street, opposite the courthouse, 27 Poles were hanged. The bodies of the hostages dangled for hours directly behind the wall of the former ghetto (dividing Leszno into "Aryan" and "non-Aryan" sides). Passersby were not allowed to stop at the site of the execution, but the scene was visible without obstruction. Ten days later, the names of the hanged were published in the Nazi-controlled Nowy Kurier Warszawski. Among the victims were 12 soldiers of the VIII District of the Warsaw County Subdistrict, arrested in Radiowo, Laski, Izabelin, Lipków, and other places in Kampinos, as well as several orphans from the Father Siemiec Orphanage. Wojciech Łysakowski, codenamed Wojtek, a Kedyw soldier wounded and captured during the attack on German police cars on Puławska Street (2 December 1943), was also hanged.

On February 15, at 6 Senatorska Street (corner of Miodowa Street), the Germans shot about 40 men brought from Pawiak. Around 210 prisoners, including 18 women, were also executed in the ruins of the ghetto. One of the hostages killed that day was Wiktor Mieczkowski (a doctor, scouting activist, and commander of the Central District of the Warsaw Grey Ranks). For the next several days, Warsaw residents gathered in large numbers at the execution site on Senatorska Street, bringing candles and flowers. On the evening of February 17, a German patrol opened fire on the gathered crowd without warning, killing or wounding several people. About 20 were detained and taken to Szucha Avenue.

The execution on Senatorska Street was the last street execution in Warsaw conducted by the Germans before the Warsaw Uprising. The successful assassination of Kutschera convinced the German occupation authorities that his chosen tactics were counterproductive. They failed to pacify Warsaw and did not succeed in causing a rift between the Polish underground and the civilian population. The only tangible "success" the Germans could claim was the heavy human toll inflicted on Warsaw's population. Blind terror increased the resistance's determination, prompting many previously passive units to join the underground activities. The mood of the occupation authorities was expressed by a high-ranking German officer after Kutschera's assassination: Strings stretched to the breaking point can snap at any moment.

After Kutschera's death, German terror in Warsaw noticeably eased. SS-Oberführer Paul Otto Geibel, the new SS and police leader for the Warsaw District, abandoned street executions of hostages in the city. The Germans also partially ceased announcing the executions of prisoners via loudspeaker and posters. There was a clear effort by the occupiers not to give Poles opportunities to display patriotic sentiments. However, mass executions continued in the ruins of the Warsaw Ghetto.

== Victims ==
In public announcements and posters, published in Warsaw between 15 October 1943 and 15 February 1944, the German occupying authorities admitted to executing 1,763 Polish hostages. However, the actual number of victims was much higher. Reports from the Home Army intelligence, based on information from a covert cell on Pawiak, indicated that at least 5,000 people were killed in Warsaw during this period. This means that during Kutschera's tenure, between 270 and 300 people were being killed in Warsaw weekly. Most of the victims, whose names were not listed in the German announcements, remain anonymous. This is because individuals caught during street roundups were not recorded in prison registers, were kept in strict isolation from other prisoners while at Pawiak, and their bodies were burned in the ghetto along with their documents.

The vast majority of the victims executed between 15 October 1943 and 15 February 1944 were killed in secret executions within the ghetto area. However, during this period, there were also between 32 and 38 public executions on the streets of Warsaw. According to Władysław Bartoszewski and Regina Domańska, at least 1,200 people were killed in this manner. Additionally, between 80 and 100 Pawiak prisoners were shot on the streets of suburban towns around Warsaw.

== Perpetrators ==
The responsibility for the crimes committed in Warsaw between 15 October 1943 and 15 February 1944 primarily lies with SS-Brigadeführer Franz Kutschera, the SS and police leader for the Warsaw District, and Ludwig Fischer, the governor of the Warsaw District. SS-Obersturmbannführer Dr. Ludwig Hahn, the commander of the Sicherheitsdienst and Sicherheitspolizei in the Warsaw District, was also heavily involved in the extermination campaign, effectively serving as the "number two" in the German police apparatus in Warsaw. SS-Sturmbannführer Walter Stamm, head of Section IV in the office of the Sicherheitsdienst and Sicherheitspolizei commander for the Warsaw District, was responsible for planning and overseeing mass repressions. SS-Hauptsturmführer Paul Werner (Stamm's deputy), SS-Obersturmführer Norbert Bergh-Trips, and SS-Obersturmführer Walter Witossek frequently directed both public and secret executions of Polish hostages. Witossek often chaired the summary court that mass-approved death sentences for Polish hostages and political prisoners. The summary court frequently included SS-Untersturmführer G. Schneider and SS-Sturmscharführer Rudolf Hornig. Street roundups and executions were typically carried out by officers of the German Schutzpolizei (protective police), whom the Polish population commonly referred to as "gendarmerie". Since June 1943, the commander of the Schutzpolizei in the Warsaw District was Police Lieutenant Colonel Wilhelm Rodewald. Members of the Pawiak staff, including the brutal shift leaders SS-Oberscharführer Otto Zander and SS-Unterscharführer Engelbert Frühwirth, also participated in the executions.

On 3 March 1947, Ludwig Fischer was sentenced to death by the Supreme National Tribunal. The sentence was carried out. Ludwig Hahn lived for many years in Hamburg under his real name. He only faced trial in 1972 and, after a year-long trial, was sentenced to 12 years in prison. In a subsequent trial regarding his role in the mass deportations of Warsaw Jews to the Treblinka extermination camp, the Hamburg jury sentenced him to life imprisonment (1975). Hahn was released in 1983 and died three years later. The Hamburg prosecutor's office also conducted an investigation against Walter Stamm, who died before the indictment was brought to court (1970).

Walter Witossek committed suicide in 1945. Paul Werner survived the war, but his further fate is unknown. Engelbert Frühwirth died in Vienna in 1964, before the investigation against him was concluded. Norbert Bergh-Trips, the last commandant of Pawiak, died in 1980 without being tried for his crimes in Warsaw. The investigation against him was dismissed by the Austrian prosecutor's office.

== Bibliography ==
- Bartoszewski, Władysław (2008). 1859 dni Warszawy (in Polish). Kraków: Znak. ISBN 978-83-240-1057-8.
- Bartoszewski, Władysław (2007). "Egzekucje publiczne w Warszawie w latach 1943 do 1944". Pisma wybrane 1942–2006 (in Polish). Vol. I. Kraków: UNIVERSITAS. ISBN 97883-242-0698-8.
- Bartoszewski, Władysław (1970). Straceni na ulicach miasta. Egzekucje w Warszawie 16. X. 1943 – 26. VII. 1944 (in Polish). Warsaw: Książka i Wiedza.
- Bartoszewski, Władysław (1970). Warszawski pierścień śmierci 1939–1944 (in Polish). Warsaw: Interpress.
- Biernacki, Stanisław (1989). Okupant a polski ruch oporu. Władze hitlerowskie w walce z ruchem oporu w dystrykcie warszawskim 1939–1944 (in Polish). Warsaw: GKBZpNP-IPN.
- Domańska, Regina (1978). Pawiak – więzienie Gestapo. Kronika lat 1939–1944 (in Polish). Warsaw: Książka i Wiedza.
- Dunin-Wąsowicz, Krzysztof (1987). Raporty Ludwiga Fischera – gubernatora dystryktu warszawskiego 1939–1944 (in Polish). Warsaw: Książka i Wiedza. ISBN 83-05-11197-0.
- Kopka, Bogusław (2007). Konzentrationslager Warschau. Historia i następstwa (in Polish). Warsaw: Instytut Pamięci Narodowej. ISBN 978-83-60464-46-5.
- Landau, Ludwik (1962). Kronika lat wojny i okupacji (in Polish). Vol. III. Warsaw: Państwowe Wydawnictwo Naukowe.
- Strzembosz, Tomasz (1983). Akcje zbrojne podziemnej Warszawy 1939–1944 (in Polish). Warsaw: Państwowy Instytut Wydawniczy. ISBN 83-06-00717-4.
- Szarota, Tomasz (2010). Okupowanej Warszawy dzień powszedni (in Polish). Warsaw: Czytelnik. ISBN 978-83-07-03239-9.
