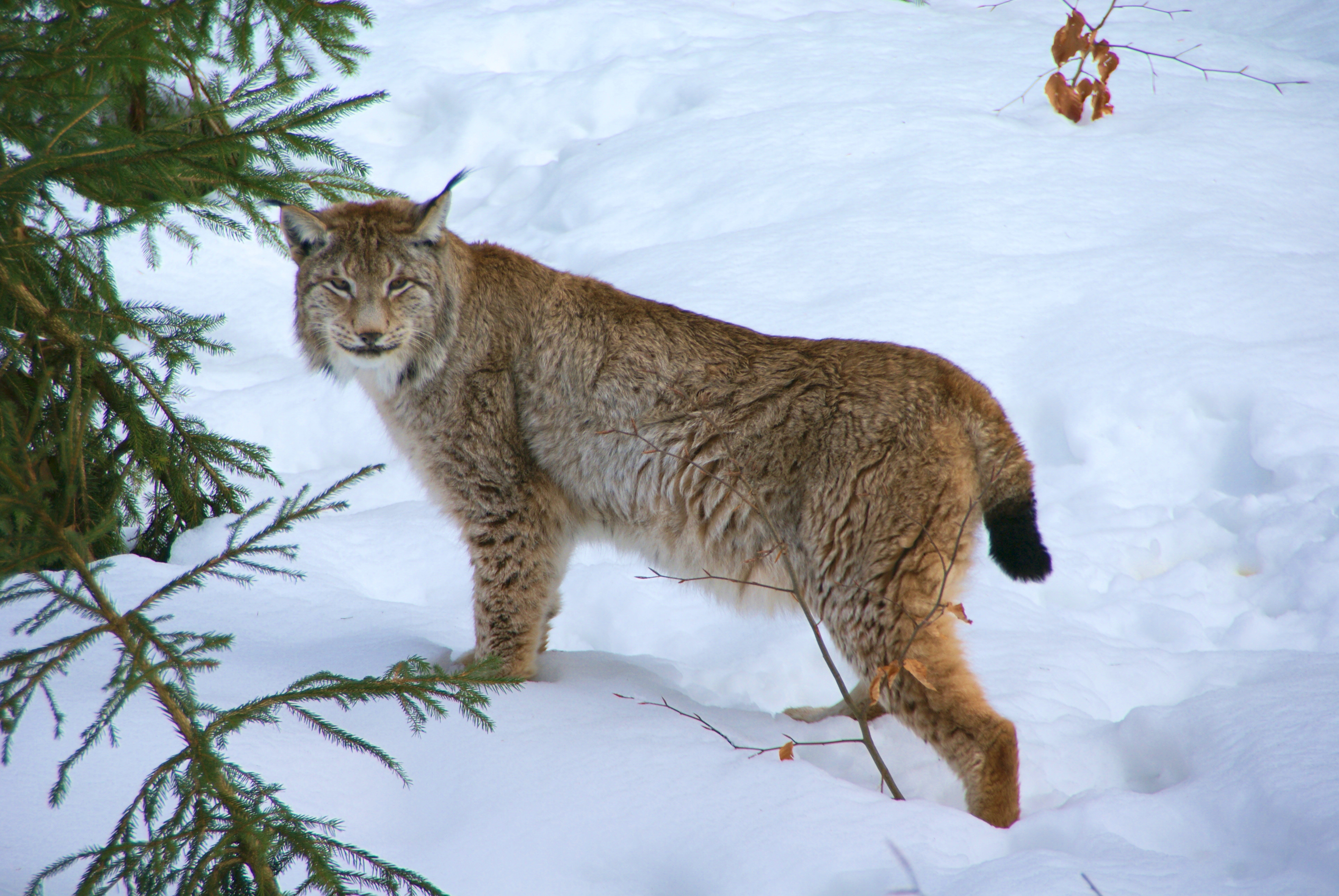
- Lynx in the Bavarian Forest National Park, Germany

Conservation status
- Least Concern (IUCN 3.1)
- CITES Appendix II

Scientific classification
- Kingdom: Animalia
- Phylum: Chordata
- Class: Mammalia
- Order: Carnivora
- Family: Felidae
- Genus: Lynx
- Species: L. lynx

Binomial name
- Lynx lynx (Linnaeus, 1758)
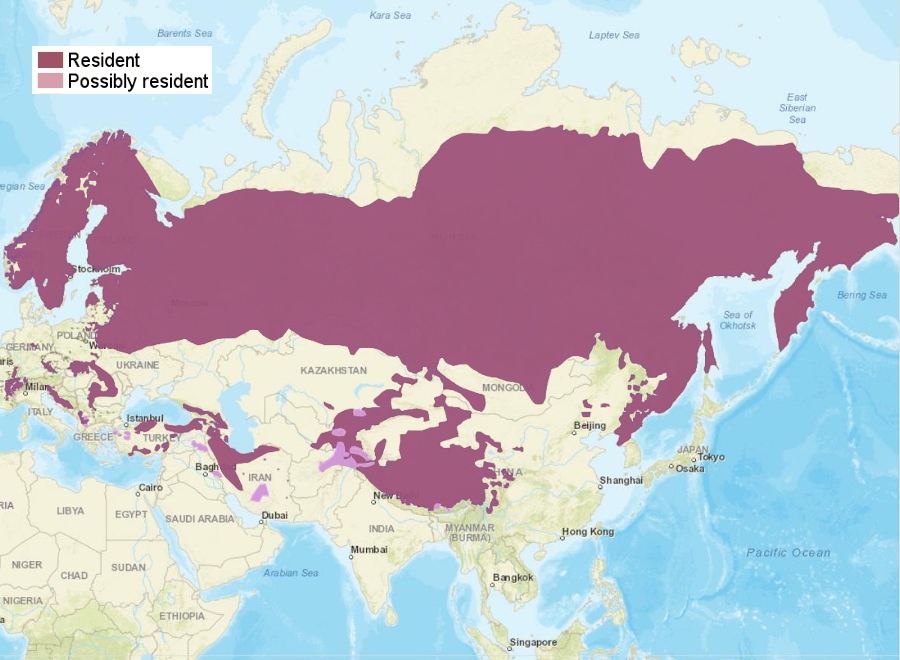
- Distribution of Eurasian lynx, 2015

Synonyms
- Felis lynx Linnaeus, 1758

= Eurasian lynx =

Species of medium-sized cat native to Eurasia

The Eurasian lynx (Lynx lynx) is one of the four extant species within the medium-sized wild cat genus Lynx. It is widely distributed from Northern, Central and Eastern Europe to Central Asia and Siberia, the Tibetan Plateau and the Himalayas. It inhabits temperate and boreal forests up to an elevation of 5,500 m (18,000 ft). Despite its wide distribution, it is threatened by habitat loss and fragmentation, poaching and depletion of prey.

== Characteristics ==
The Eurasian lynx has a relatively short, reddish or brown coat that is marked with black spots; their number and pattern are highly variable. The underparts, neck and chin are whitish. The fur is more brightly coloured with more numerous spots in animals living at the southern end of its range. In winter, it is much thicker and varies from silver-grey to greyish brown. Some animals have dark brown stripes on the forehead and back. It has powerful, relatively long legs, with large webbed and furred paws that act like snowshoes. It also has a short "bobbed" tail with an all-black tip, black tufts of hair on its ears, and a long grey-and-white ruff.

It is the largest of the four lynx species, ranging in body length from 76–106 cm (30–42 in) in males; 73–99 cm (29–39 in) in females; and standing 55–75 cm (22–30 in) at the shoulder. The tail is 11–24.5 cm (4.3–9.6 in) long, constituting a total length of up to 130 cm (51 in) in the largest males. Weights of both sexes in Russia range from 12 to 32 kg (26 to 71 lb), but more than 30 kg (66 lb) is attained very rarely and is possibly exaggerated. A Eurasian lynx from the Altai Mountains allegedly weighed 35 kg (77 lb). Those inhabiting Fennoscandia and westwards are considerably smaller, with a range of just 7–26 kg (15–57 lb), though individuals in the Carpathian Mountains may rival those in the Altai in size.

== Taxonomy ==
Felis lynx was the scientific name used in 1758 by Carl Linnaeus in his work Systema Naturae. In the 19th and 20th centuries, the following Eurasian lynx subspecies were proposed:

Subspecies	Distribution	Image
Northern lynx (L. l. lynx) (Linnaeus, 1758)	Fennoscandia, the Baltic states, Poland, Belarus, European Russia, the Ural Mountains, Western Siberia and east to the Yenisei river.	
Turkestan lynx (L. l. isabellinus) Blyth, 1847	West-Central Asia to Northern South Asia: Afghanistan, Bhutan, China (Tibet), India (Jammu & Kashmir, Ladakh), Kazakhstan, Kyrgyzstan, Mongolia, Nepal, Pakistan, Russia (Altai Krai, Altai Republic) Tajikistan, Turkmenistan, and Uzbekistan.	
Caucasian lynx (L. l. dinniki) Satunin, 1915	Caucasus, Iran, Turkey, and European Russia.	
Siberian lynx (L. l. wrangeli) Ognew, 1928	Russian Far East, Kamchatka Peninsula, the Stanovoy Range and east of the Yenisei River.	
Balkan lynx (L. l. balcanicus) Bures, 1941	Eastern Serbia and western North Macedonia, with smaller populations in Montenegro and Albania.	
Carpathian lynx (L. l. carpathicus) Kratochvil & Stollmann, 1963	Carpathian Basin of Romania, Slovakia, Slovenia, Croatia, Hungary, Ukraine, Bulgaria and Northern Italy.	

The following were also proposed, but are not considered valid taxa:

- Altai lynx (L. l. wardi) Lydekker, 1904
- Baikal lynx (L. l. kozlovi) Fetisov, 1950
- Amur lynx (L. l. stroganovi) Heptner, 1969
- Sardinian lynx (L. l. sardiniae) Mola, 1908

== Distribution and habitat ==
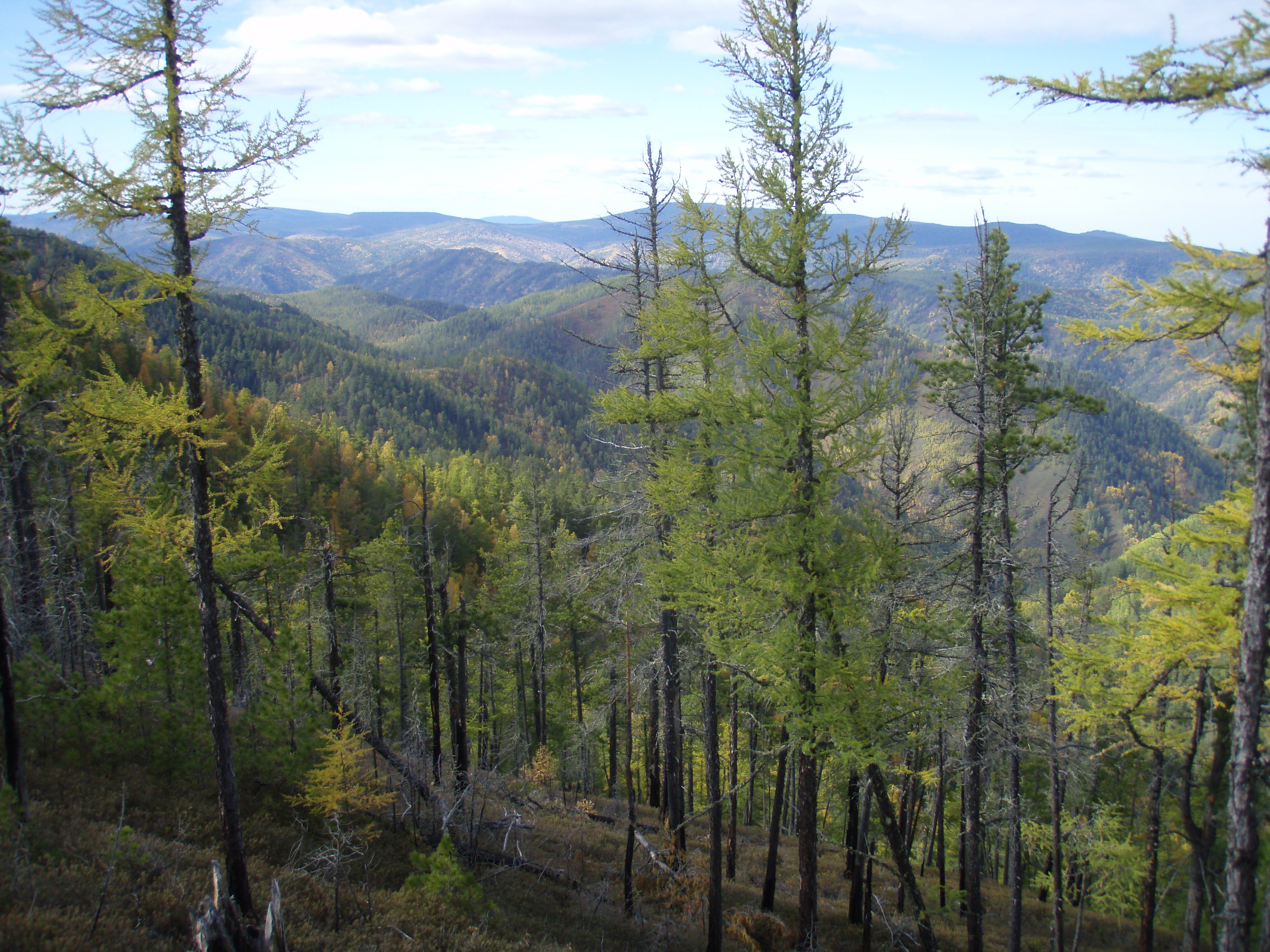
Boreal and montane forest habitats

The Eurasian lynx inhabits rugged country providing plenty of hideouts and stalking opportunities. Depending on the locality, this may include rocky-steppe, mixed forest-steppe, boreal forest, and montane forest ecosystems. In the more mountainous parts of its range, Eurasian lynx descends to the lowlands in winter, following prey species and avoiding deep snow. Despite its adaptations for moving in snow, it finds loose, deep snow difficult to deal with and cannot survive in areas with snow depths exceeding 100 cm (39 in). It tends to be less common where the grey wolf (Canis lupus) is abundant, and wolves have been reported to attack and even eat lynx.

=== Europe ===
The Eurasian lynx was once widespread throughout most of continental Europe. By the early 19th century, it was persecuted to local extinction in western and southern European lowlands, but survived only in mountainous areas and Scandinavian forests. By the 1950s, it had become extinct in most of Western and Central Europe, where only scattered and isolated populations exist today.

==== Fennoscandia ====
The Eurasian lynx was close to extinction in Scandinavia in the 1930s. Since the 1950s, the population slowly recovered and forms three subpopulations in northern, central and southern Scandinavia. In Norway, the Eurasian lynx was subjected to an official bounty between 1846 and 1980 and could be hunted without license. In 1994, a compensation scheme for livestock killed by lynx was introduced. By 1996, the lynx population was estimated to comprise 410 individuals, decreased to fewer than 260 individuals in 2004 and increased since 2005 to about 452 mature individuals by 2008.

In Sweden, the lynx population was estimated at 1,400 individuals in 2006 and 1,250 in 2011. Hunting is controlled by government agencies. In Finland, about 2,200–2,300 individuals were present according to a 2009 estimate. The lynx population in Finland has been increasing every year since 1991, and is estimated to be nowadays larger than ever before. Limited hunting is permitted. In 2009 the Finnish Ministry of Agriculture and Forestry gave a permit for hunting of 340 lynx individuals.

==== Western Europe ====
In Great Britain, subfossil remains of Eurasian lynx have been dated to the early Middle Ages, and the 7th or 8th century Welsh poem Dinogad's Smock likely makes reference to the presence of lynx in Cumbria. It is possible that other Medieval and Modern era references to "wild cats" and "cats of the mountain", as late as the 18th century, actually refer to Eurasian lynx and not the wildcat as is commonly assumed. It has been proposed to reintroduce the lynx to the Scottish Highlands and Kielder Forest in Northumberland. In January 2025, several lynxes were illegally released near Kingussie in the Cairngorms National Park; they were captured by the Royal Zoological Society of Scotland and taken to the Highland Wildlife Park and subsequently to Edinburgh Zoo.

A large lynx that hunted deer and livestock, sometimes called "tiger" and "deer's wolf" (llobu/lobo cerval), was also reported in Green Spain until the 19th century. These accounts were traditionally regarded as references to Iberian lynx (Lynx pardinus), a smaller endemic species of the Iberian Peninsula. However, genetic testing of remains showed that the Eurasian and Iberian lynx coexisted into recent times in the Iberian Peninsula with little overlap, the Eurasian lynx being present in temperate broadleaf and mixed forests and the Iberian lynx in Mediterranean forests, woodlands, and scrub. The Eurasian lynx of Spain was a unique, extinct lineage more related to the Carpathian and Baltic subspecies. It was genetically impoverished already in pre-Roman times, possibly because of founder effect, which made it even more vulnerable to human persecution. The government of Asturias studied the feasibility of Eurasian lynx reintroduction in 2019. In the Catalonian Pyrenees, the last Eurasian lynx was killed in the 1930s, though unconfirmed sightings continued until the 1990s. The Síndic d'Aran planned a reintroduction in 2016 but canceled it due to the opposition of hunters and livestock farmers.

In Germany, the Eurasian lynx was exterminated in 1850. It was reintroduced to the Bavarian Forest and the Harz in the 1990s; other areas were populated by lynxes migrating from France and the Czech Republic. In 2002, the first birth of wild lynx on German territory was announced, following a litter from a pair of lynx in the Harz National Park. Small populations exist also in Saxon Switzerland, Palatinate Forest, and Fichtel Mountains. Eurasian lynx also migrated to Austria, where they had also been exterminated. An episode of the PBS television series Nature featured the return of the lynx to Austria's Kalkalpen National Park after a 150-year absence. A higher proportion is killed by humans than by infectious diseases.

In Switzerland, the Eurasian lynx was exterminated in the early 20th century, with the last confirmed sighting around Simplon pass in 1904. From 1971 on, Carpathian lynx were reintroduced in the Alps and the Jura Mountains. Since then, the population has grown slowly but steadily. In 2019, around 250 lynx were reportedly living in Switzerland, roughly a third of them in the Jura Mountains, and the rest in the Alps and Pre-Alps.

The Eurasian lynx was exterminated in the French Alps in the early 20th century. Following reintroduction of lynx in the Swiss Jura Mountains in the 1970s, lynxes were recorded again in the French Alps and Jura from the late 1970s onwards.

In Italy, it recolonised the Italian Alps since the 1980s, also from reintroduced populations in Switzerland, Austria and Slovenia. By 2010, the Alpine lynx population comprised about 120–150 individuals ranging over 27,800 km^{2} (10,700 sq mi) in six sub-areas.

In the Netherlands, lynxes have been sighted sporadically since 1985 in the country's southern part. Since 2020, the presence of lynxes has been confirmed by camera trapping in the Ardennes region in southern Belgium, proving the presence of the species following more than 25 years of unconfirmed sightings in the region.

==== Central and Eastern Europe ====
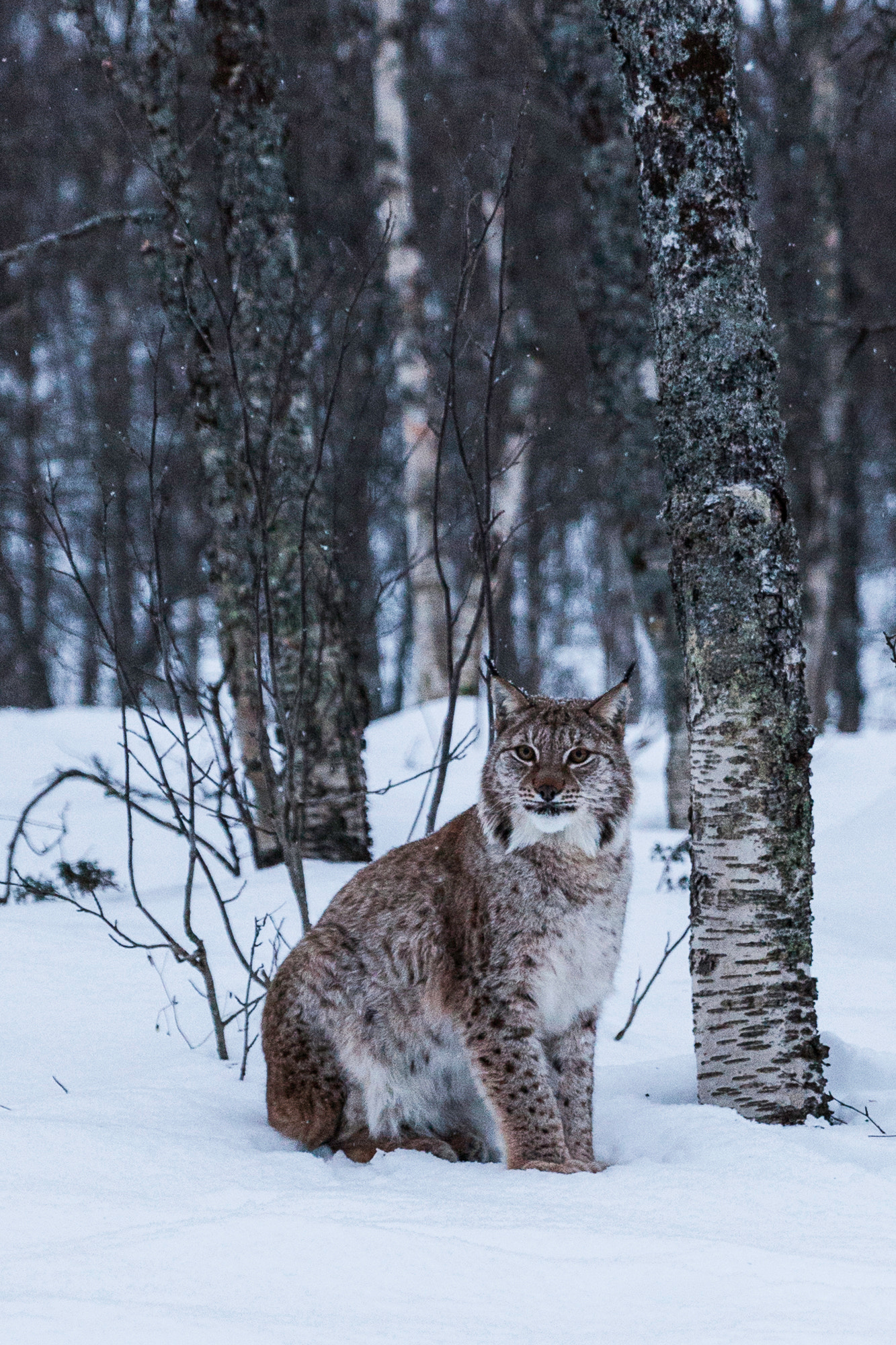
Northern lynx

- Balkan Peninsula: The Balkan lynx subspecies is found in Serbia, Croatia, Montenegro, Albania, Kosovo, North Macedonia, Bulgaria and possibly Greece. They can be found in remote mountainous regions of the Balkans, with the largest numbers in remote hills of western North Macedonia, eastern Albania and northern Albania. The Balkan lynx is considered a national symbol of North Macedonia, and it is depicted on the reverse of the Macedonian 5 denars coin, issued in 1993. The name of Lynkestis, a Macedonian tribe, is translated as "Land of the Lynx". It has been on the brink of extinction for nearly 100 years. Numbers are estimated to be around 100, and the decline is due to illegal poaching.
- Carpathian Mountains: About 2,800 Eurasian lynx live in the mountain range, split between the Czech Republic, Poland, Romania, Slovakia, Ukraine and Hungary. It is the largest contiguous Eurasian lynx population west of the Russian border.
- Dinaric Alps and Julian Alps: Slovenia, Croatia, and Bosnia and Herzegovina are home to approx. 130–200 lynx. The Eurasian lynx had been considered extinct in these countries since the beginning of the 20th century. However, a successful reintroduction project was carried out in Slovenia in 1973, when three female and three male lynx from Slovakia were released in the Kočevski Rog forest. Today, lynx are present in the Dinaric forests of the south and southeastern part of Slovenia and in the Croatian regions of Gorski kotar and Velebit, spanning the Dinaric Alps and over the Dinara Mountains into western Bosnia and Herzegovina. The lynx has been also spotted in the Julian Alps and elsewhere in western Slovenia, but the A1 motorway presents a significant hindrance to the development of the population there. Croatia's Plitvice Lakes National Park is home to several pairs of the lynx. In the three countries, the Eurasian lynx is listed as an endangered species and protected by law. Realistic population estimates are 40 lynx in Slovenia, 40–60 in Croatia, and more than 50 in Bosnia and Herzegovina. The Croatian massif Risnjak in Risnjak National Park got its name from the Croatian word for the lynx, ris.
- Belarus: the most recent data from the national parks, reserves, and hunting grounds demonstrate the number of lynxes in Belarus to be in the range of 550 to 600 animals.
- Bulgaria: the animal was declared extinct in Bulgaria in 1985, but sightings continued well into the 1990s. In 2006 an audio recording of a lynx mating call was made in the Strandzha mountain range in the southeast. Two years later an ear-marked individual was accidentally shot near Belogradchik in the northwest, and a few months later a mounted trap camera caught a glimpse of another individual. Further camera records followed in Osogovo and Strandzha, confirming that the species has returned to the country. A thorough examination on the subject is yet to be made available.
- Czech Republic: In Bohemia, the Eurasian lynx was exterminated in the 19th century (1830–1890) and in Moravia probably at the turn of the 20th century. After 1945, migration from Slovakia created a small and unstable population in Moravia. In the 1980s, almost 20 specimens were imported from Slovakia and reintroduced in the Šumava area. In early 2006, the population of lynx in the Czech Republic was estimated at 65–105 individuals. Hunting is prohibited, but the lynx is often threatened by poachers.
- Estonia: There are 900 individuals in Estonia according to a 2001 estimate. Although 180 lynx were legally hunted in Estonia in 2010, the country still has the highest known density of the species in Europe.
- Hungary: The population is estimated at 10-12 animals, in the northern mountain ranges of the country close to Slovakia.
- Latvia: According to a 2005 estimate, about 700 animals inhabit areas in Courland and Vidzeme.
- Lithuania: The population is estimated at 80–100 animals.
- Poland: In its Environment and Environmental Protection Section, the 2011 Central Statistical Office Report puts the number of Eurasian lynxes observed in the wild in Poland as of 2010 at approximately 285. There are two major populations of lynxes in Poland, one in the northeastern part of the country (most notably in the Białowieża Forest) and the other in the southeastern part in the Carpathian Mountains. Since the 1980s, lynxes have also been spotted in the region of Roztocze, Solska Forest, Polesie Lubelskie, and Karkonosze Mountains, though they still remain rare in those areas. A successfully reintroduced population of lynxes has also been living in the Kampinos National Park since the 1990s.
- Slovakia: the Eurasian lynx inhabits deciduous, coniferous and mixed forests at elevations of 180–1,592 m (591–5,223 ft), mostly in national parks and other protected areas; its presence has been positively confirmed in more than half of Slovak territory (2012). In terms of absolute numbers though in Štiavnica Mountains and Veľká Fatra National Park, surveys during 2011 to 2014 revealed that less than 30 individuals were present in these protected areas, with anthropic disturbances, poaching and insufficient counting methods used by forestry cited as the main causes of the unreliable population figures.
- Romania: over 2,000 Eurasian lynx live in Romania, including most of the Carpathian population. However, some experts consider these official population numbers to be overestimated. Limited hunting is permitted but the population is stable.
- Russia: As of 2013, the Russian lynx population was estimated as comprising 22,510 individuals, of which about 9,000 were found in European Russia. The populations were assessed as stable in some regions, but decreasing in others.
- Ukraine: The Eurasian lynx is native to forested areas of the country. Before the 19th century it was common also in the forest steppe zone. Nowadays, the most significant populations remain in the Carpathian mountains and across the forests of Polesia. The population is estimated as 80–90 animals for the Polesia region and 350–400 for the forests of the Carpathians.

=== Asia ===
==== Anatolia and Caucasus ====
In the Anatolian part of Turkey, the Eurasian lynx is present in the Lesser Caucasus, Kaçkar Mountains and Artvin Province. In Ciglikara Nature Reserve located in the Taurus Mountains, 15 individuals were identified. More than 50 individuals were identified and monitored at a forest-steppe mixed ecosystem in northwestern Anatolia by camera traps, genetic material and radiotelemetry between 2009 and 2019. In Kars Province, a breeding population occurs in Sarıkamış-Allahuekber Mountains National Park. The Eurasian lynx and grey wolf can occur sympatrically, as they occupy different trophic niches.

==== Central Asia ====
In Central Asia, it is native to Kazakhstan, Uzbekistan, Turkmenistan, Kyrgyzstan, Tajikistan, Afghanistan and the Chinese provinces of Xinjiang, Gansu, Qinghai, Sichuan, Shaanxi, and to the northern slopes of Iran's Alborz Mountains and Mongolia.

In northern Pakistan, the Eurasian lynx was recorded at elevations of 1,067–5,000 m (3,501–16,404 ft) in Chitral District. In India: Ladakh, Himachal Pradesh, Kashmir and most other Himalayan states.

In Nepal, a Eurasian lynx was sighted in the western Dhaulagiri massif in 1975. It is also present above elevations of 3,800 m (12,500 ft) in Humla, Mustang and Dolpa Districts.

==== East Asia ====
Fossils of the Eurasian or a closely related Lynx species from the Late Pleistocene era and onward were excavated at various locations in the Japanese archipelago. Since no archaeological evidence dated after the Yayoi period has been found, it was probably extirpated from the Japanese archipelago during the Jōmon period.

== Behaviour and ecology ==
=== Behavior ===
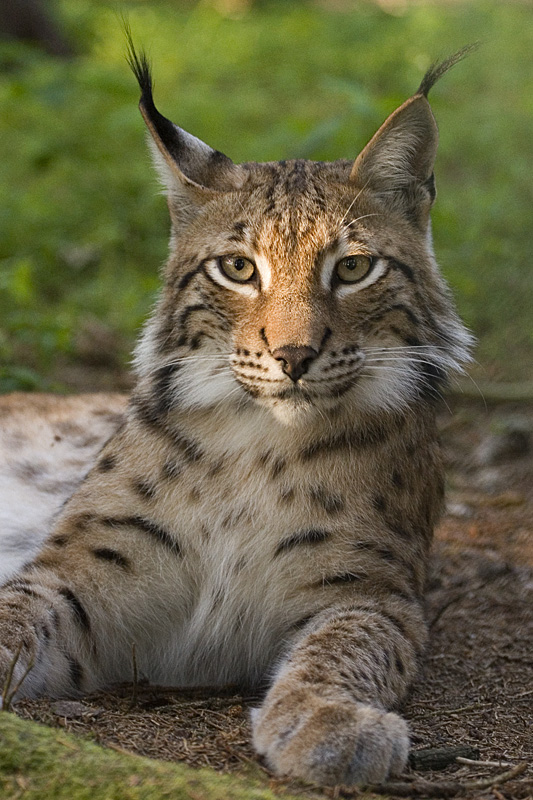
Eurasian lynx

Although they may hunt during the day when food is scarce, the Eurasian lynx is mainly nocturnal or crepuscular, and spends the day sleeping in dense thickets or other places of concealment. It lives solitarily as an adult. The hunting area of Eurasian lynx can be anything from 20 to 450 km^{2} (7.7 to 173.7 sq mi), depending on the local availability of prey. Males tend to hunt over much larger areas than females, which tend to occupy exclusive, rather than overlapping, hunting ranges. The Eurasian lynx can travel up to 20 km (12 mi) during one night, although about half this distance is more typical. They patrol regularly throughout all parts of their hunting range, using scent marks to indicate their presence to other individuals. As with other cats, its scent marks may consist of faeces, urine, or scrape marks, with the former often being left in prominent locations along the boundary of the hunting territory.

Eurasian lynx makes a range of vocalizations, but is generally silent outside of the breeding season. They have been observed to mew, hiss, growl, and purr, and, like domestic cats, will "chatter" at prey that is just out of reach. Mating calls are much louder, consisting of deep growls in the male, and loud "meow-like" sounds in the female. Eurasian lynx are secretive, and because the sounds they make are very quiet and seldom heard, their presence in an area may go unnoticed for years. Remnants of prey or tracks on snow are usually observed long before the animal is seen.

=== Diet and hunting ===
The Eurasian lynx is an ambush predator but also hunts by stalking, sneaking and jumping on prey using both vision and hearing. When snow conditions make this harder, it may be forced to switch to larger prey. It often climbs onto high rocks or fallen trees to scan the surrounding area. It is a powerful predator that has killed adult deer weighing at least 150 kg (330 lb).

Eurasian lynx in Europe prey largely on small to fairly large sized mammals and birds. Among the recorded prey items for the species are hares, rabbits, marmots, squirrels, dormice, muskrats, martens, grouse, red foxes, wild boar, chamois, young moose, European roe deer, red deer, reindeer and other ungulates. In keeping with its larger size, the Eurasian lynx is the only lynx species to preferentially take ungulates. Although taking on larger prey presents a risk to the Eurasian lynx, the bounty provided by killing them can outweigh the risks. The Eurasian lynx thus prefers fairly large ungulate prey, especially during winter, when small prey is less abundant. Where common, roe deer appear to be the preferred prey species for the Eurasian lynx.

In Estonia, an adult lynx kills about 60 roe deer a year; in the years when the roe deer population plummets, the lynx switches to Eurasian beaver, hares, foxes, Common raccoon dog, and Phasianinae. Even where roe deer are quite uncommon, the deer are still quantitatively the favored prey species, though in summer smaller prey and occasional domestic sheep are eaten more regularly. In parts of Finland, introduced white-tailed deer are eaten regularly. In some areas in Poland and Austria, red deer is the preferred prey, and in Switzerland, chamois is locally favored. Eurasian lynx also feeds on carrion when available. Adult lynx require 1.1 to 2 kg (2.4 to 4.4 lb) of meat per day, and may take several days to fully consume some of their larger prey.

In the Mediterranean mixed forest-steppe and subalpine ecosystems of Anatolia the main and most preferred prey of the Eurasian lynx is European hare, forming 79% to 99% of prey biomass eaten. Although the lynx is in sympatry with wild ungulates, such as wild goat, chamois, red deer and wild boar in these ecosystems, ungulate biomass in lynx diet does not exceed 10%. In ten other study sites in the Black Sea region of northern Anatolia where roe deer can occur in high densities, lynx occurrence is positively correlated with European hare occurrence rather than roe deer. Lynx in Anatolia also has physiological requirements and morphological adjustments similar to other lagomorph specialists, with a daily prey intake of about 900 g (32 oz). It is therefore classified as lagomorph specialist. Diet studies in central Asia and Sakha Republic also indicate a diet mainly composed of lagomorphs and ungulate prey contributes in low amounts to lynx diet. Eurasian lynx scat found in Dolpa District in the Nepal Himalayas contained remains of woolly hare (Lepus oiostolus), pika (Ochotona sp.), mountain voles (Alticola sp.), Himalayan marmot (Marmota himalayana) and domestic goat (Capra hircus).

=== Reproduction ===
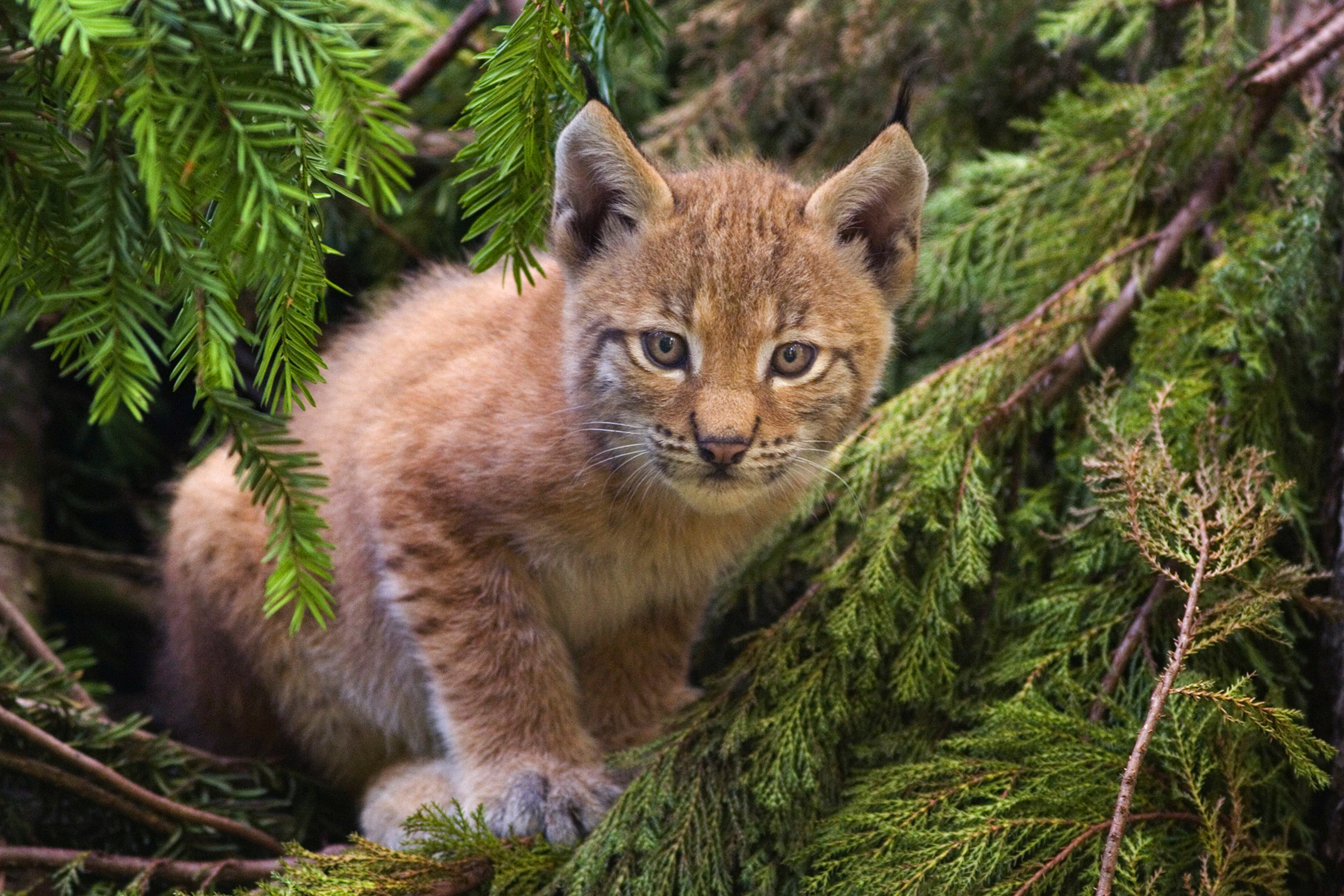
Eurasian lynx kitten

The mating season of the Eurasian lynx lasts from January to April. The female typically comes into oestrus only once during this period, lasting from four to seven days. If the first litter is lost, a second period of oestrus is common. It does not appear to be able to control its reproductive behaviour based on prey availability. Gestation lasts from 67 to 74 days. Pregnant females construct dens in secluded locations, often protected by overhanging branches or tree roots. The den is lined with feathers, deer hair, and dry grass to provide bedding for the young. At birth, Eurasian lynx kittens weigh 240 to 430 g (8.5 to 15.2 oz) and open their eyes after ten to twelve days. They initially have plain, greyish-brown fur, attaining the full adult colouration around eleven weeks of age. They begin to take solid food at six to seven weeks, when they begin to leave the den, but are not fully weaned for five or six months. The den is abandoned two to three months after the kittens are born, but the young typically remain with their mother until they are around ten months of age. Eurasian lynx reach sexual maturity at two or three years, and have lived for twenty one years in captivity.

Females usually have two kittens; litters with more than three kittens are rare.

=== Predator dynamics ===
The primary predators of the lynx are the gray wolf and, in the northern part of its range, the wolverine. In Russian forests, gray wolves kill and eat lynx that fail to escape into trees, as evidenced by examination of wolf and lynx trackways in the Central Forest Nature Reserve, and of lynx hair and bones found in wolf stomach contents in the Belovezh Forest. The lynx saves itself from its enemies by quickly climbing a tree or down the edge of a cliff or ravine; it usually lives near a 'stronghold' place and eats its food in a high tree or on an inaccessible ledge. Lynx populations decrease when wolves appear in an area, such as observed in the Pritelsk region of the Altai Mountains, and lynx are likely to take smaller prey where wolves are active. In eastern Slovakia, after an increase of wolves after World War II, lynx were observed to move out.

However, there is also a reported instance of a male lynx having expelled an adult and apparently healthy male wolf in Belarus in a fight. After the incident, the wolf vanished from the record, suggesting that it might have succumbed to the wounds sustained during the fight. Moreover, recent population dynamics and a high mortality rate among wolf cubs in the Naliboki forest might be connected to an increasing lynx population. All in all, this suggests that, at least locally, lynx may dominate wolves, since no signs for predation of wolves on lynx was found. In the Pechora-Ilych Nature Reserve in Russia, wolverine predation and consumption of lynx has been documented, and in the Altai Mountains, the lynx actively avoids wolverines.

The gray wolf, wolverine, as well as the red fox and the eagle owl, are also competitors with the Eurasian lynx for prey, notably in the taiga regions of Russia. In years of low hare populations, the competition becomes especially fierce; the lynx is at a disadvantage as its competitors are able to capture additional, larger prey animals, and more efficiently. This competition may be especially severe in the northern parts of the lynx's range, where lynx populations are vastly outnumbered by red fox and even by wolverine. The presence of other large carnivores is one factor limiting their population.

In two ecosystems of Anatolia, cannibalism was common, and fellow lynx were found to form 5% to 8% of prey biomass in their diets. Claws and bones analysed showed that sub-adult lynx were the victims of cannibalism during the mating and spring seasons. Lynx were not found in the sympatrically occurring wolves' diets. On the contrary, lynx themselves were the predators of red fox, pine marten, domestic and feral cats and dogs, and golden jackal remains have also been found in lynx fecal samples, possibly the result of carrion consumption. Occasionally, in areas such as Manchuria and the Amur River, it may be possible the Amur leopard targets lynx; in the same geographic region, Siberian tigers have also preyed on lynxes, as evidenced by examination of tiger stomach contents. In Sweden, out of 33 deaths of lynx of a population being observed, one was probably killed by a wolverine. Lynx compete for food with the predators described above, and also with the red fox, eagle owls, golden eagles, wild boar (which scavenge from lynx kills), and in the southern part of its range, the snow leopard and leopard as well. Brown bears, although not (so far as is known) a predator of Eurasian lynx, are in some areas a semi-habitual usurpers of ungulate kills by lynxes, not infrequently before the cat has had a chance to consume its kill itself.

== Conservation ==
The Eurasian lynx is included on CITES Appendix II and listed as a protected species in the Berne Convention on the Conservation of European Wildlife and Natural Habitats, Appendix III. Hunting lynx is illegal in many range countries, with the exception of Estonia, Latvia, Russia, Armenia and Iraq. Since 2005, the Norwegian government sets national population goals, while a committee of representatives from county assemblies decide on hunting quotas.
