= Kampinos =

- Village
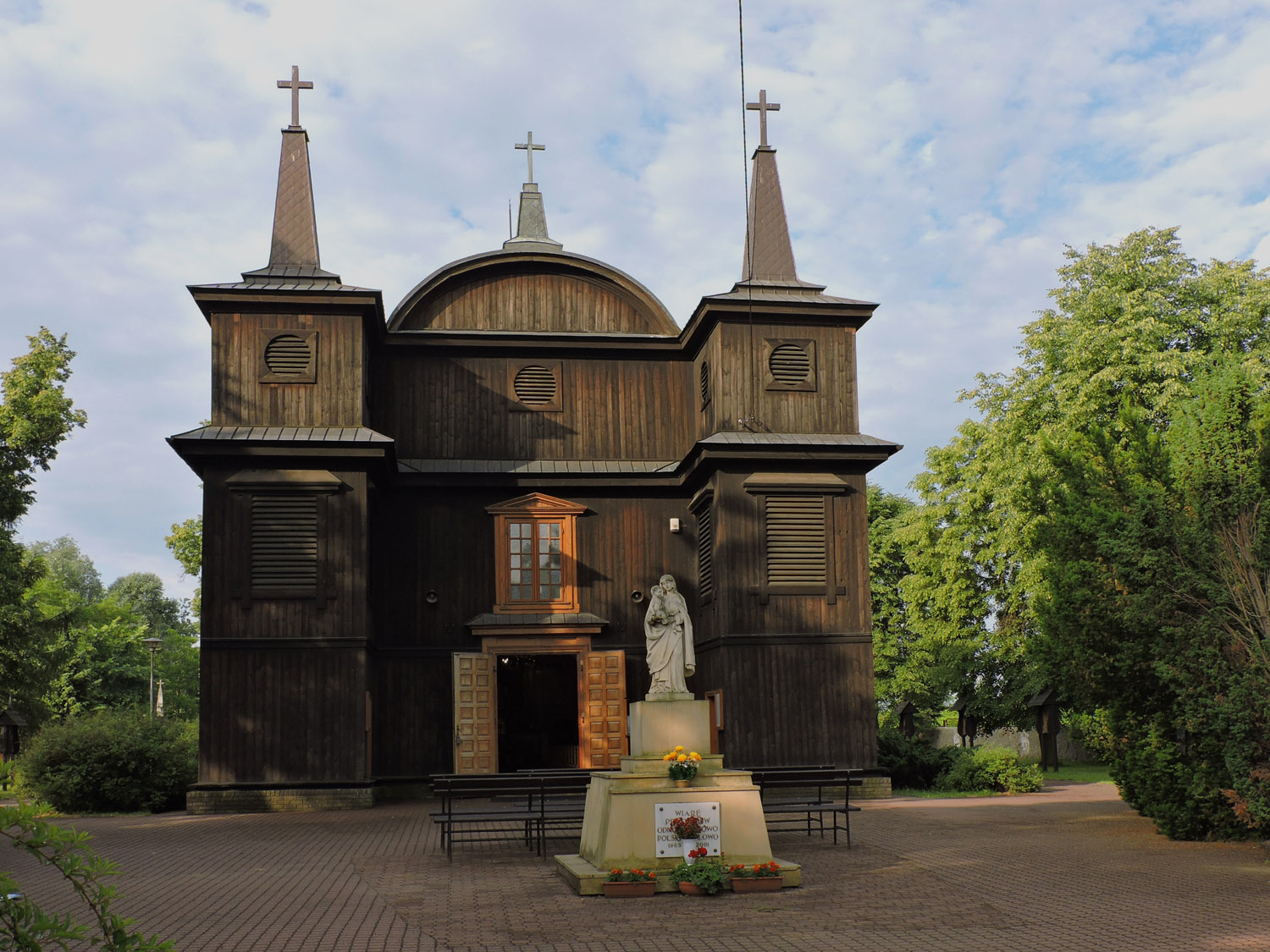
- Church of the Assumption

- Coat of arms

- Location within Poland
- Coordinates: 52°16′N 20°27′E
- Country: Poland
- Voivodeship: Masovian
- County: Warsaw West
- Gmina: Kampinos
- Website: http://www.kampinos.pl/

Kampinos [kamˈpinɔs] is a village in Warsaw West County, Masovian Voivodeship, in east-central Poland. It is the seat of the gmina (administrative district) called Gmina Kampinos.

The village lies on the southern edge of the Kampinos Forest, which is protected as a national park (Kampinos National Park) and has been designated a biosphere reserve by UNESCO.
