= Ludwików, Warsaw West County =

Ludwików
- Village
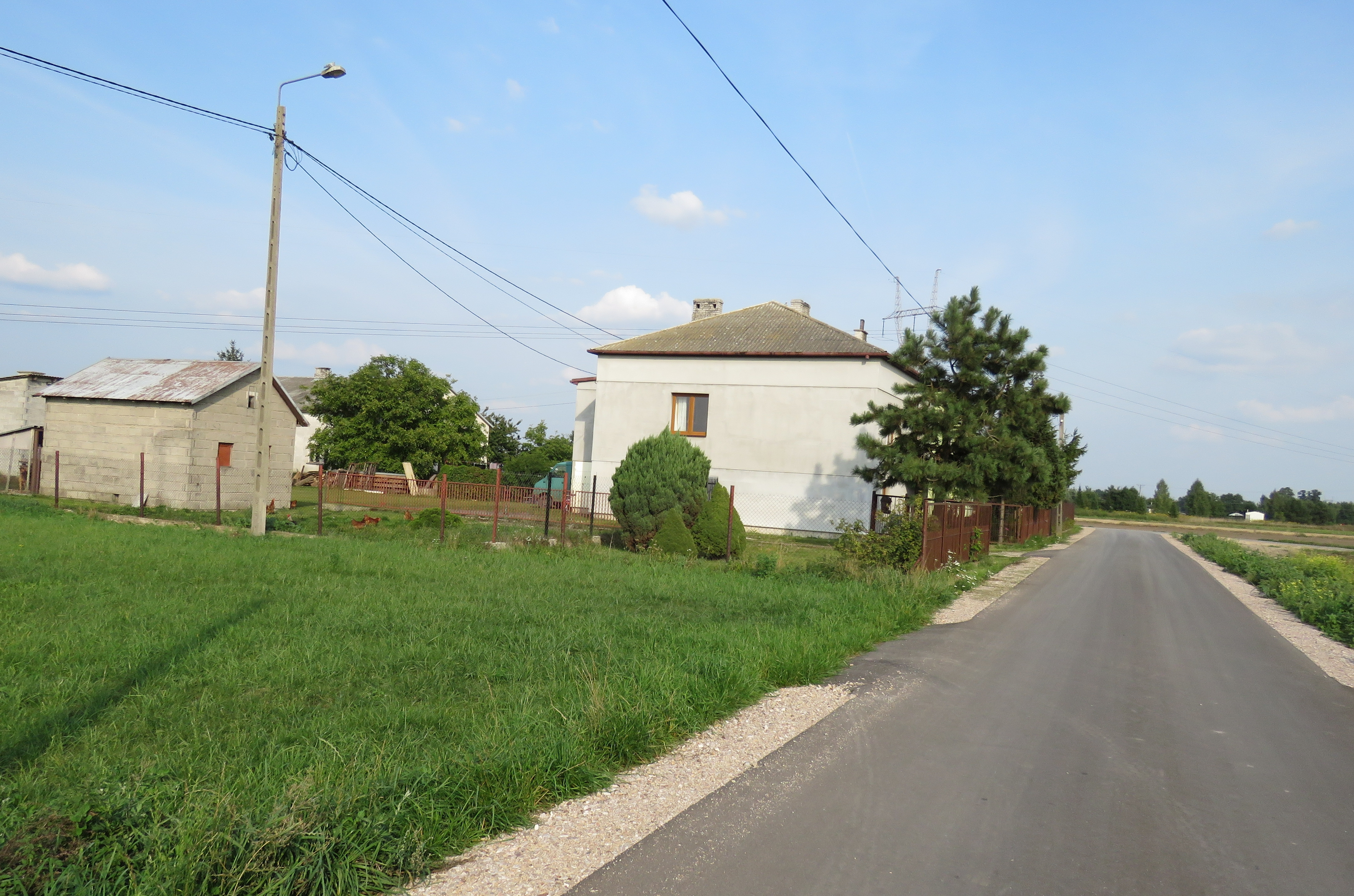
- A house in Ludwików, in 2018.

- Location within Masovian Voivodeship Location within Poland
- Coordinates: 52°19′40″N 20°25′13″E
- Country: Poland
- Voivodeship: Masovian
- County: Warsaw West
- Gmina: Kampinos
- Time zone: UTC+1 (CET)
  - Summer (DST): UTC+2 (CEST)
- Postal code: 05-085
- Area code: +48 22
- Vehicle registration: WZ
- Climate: Cfb

Ludwików (Polish: [ludˈvik.uf]) is a village in the Masovian Voivodeship, Poland, within the Gmina Kampinos, Warsaw West County.
