= Bromierzyk, Warsaw West County =

Bromierzyk
- Village
- Location within Poland
- Coordinates: 52°18′33″N 20°23′33″E
- Country: Poland
- Voivodeship: Masovian
- County: Warsaw West
- Gmina: Kampinos

Bromierzyk [brɔˈmjɛʐɨk] is a village in the administrative district of Gmina Kampinos, within Warsaw West County, Masovian Voivodeship, in east-central Poland.
