= Józefów, Gmina Kampinos =

Józefów
- Village
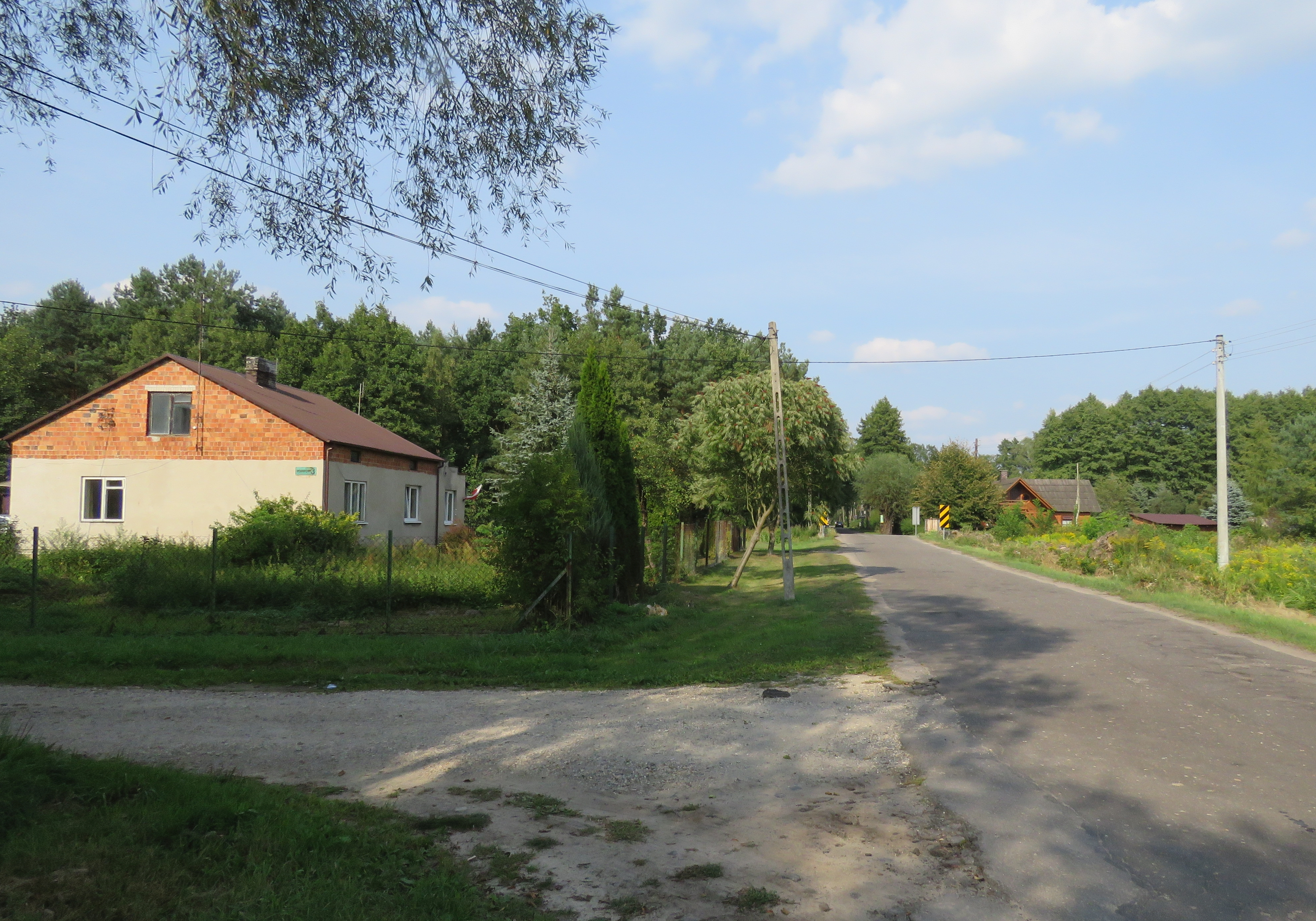

- Location within Poland
- Coordinates: 52°17′2″N 20°28′32″E
- Country: Poland
- Voivodeship: Masovian
- County: Warsaw West
- Gmina: Kampinos
- Population: 60

Józefów (Polish pronunciation: [juˈzɛfuf]) is a village in the administrative district of Gmina Kampinos, within Warsaw West County, Masovian Voivodeship, in east-central Poland.
