= Prusy, Warsaw West County =

Prusy
- Village
- Location within Poland
- Coordinates: 52°15′N 20°27′E
- Country: Poland
- Voivodeship: Masovian
- County: Warsaw West
- Gmina: Kampinos
- Population (2000): 37
- Area Code: (+48) 22
- Vehicle registration: WZ

Prusy [ˈprusɨ] is a village in the administrative district of Gmina Kampinos, within Warsaw West County, Masovian Voivodeship, in east-central Poland.
