= Strzyżew, Masovian Voivodeship =

Strzyżew
- Village
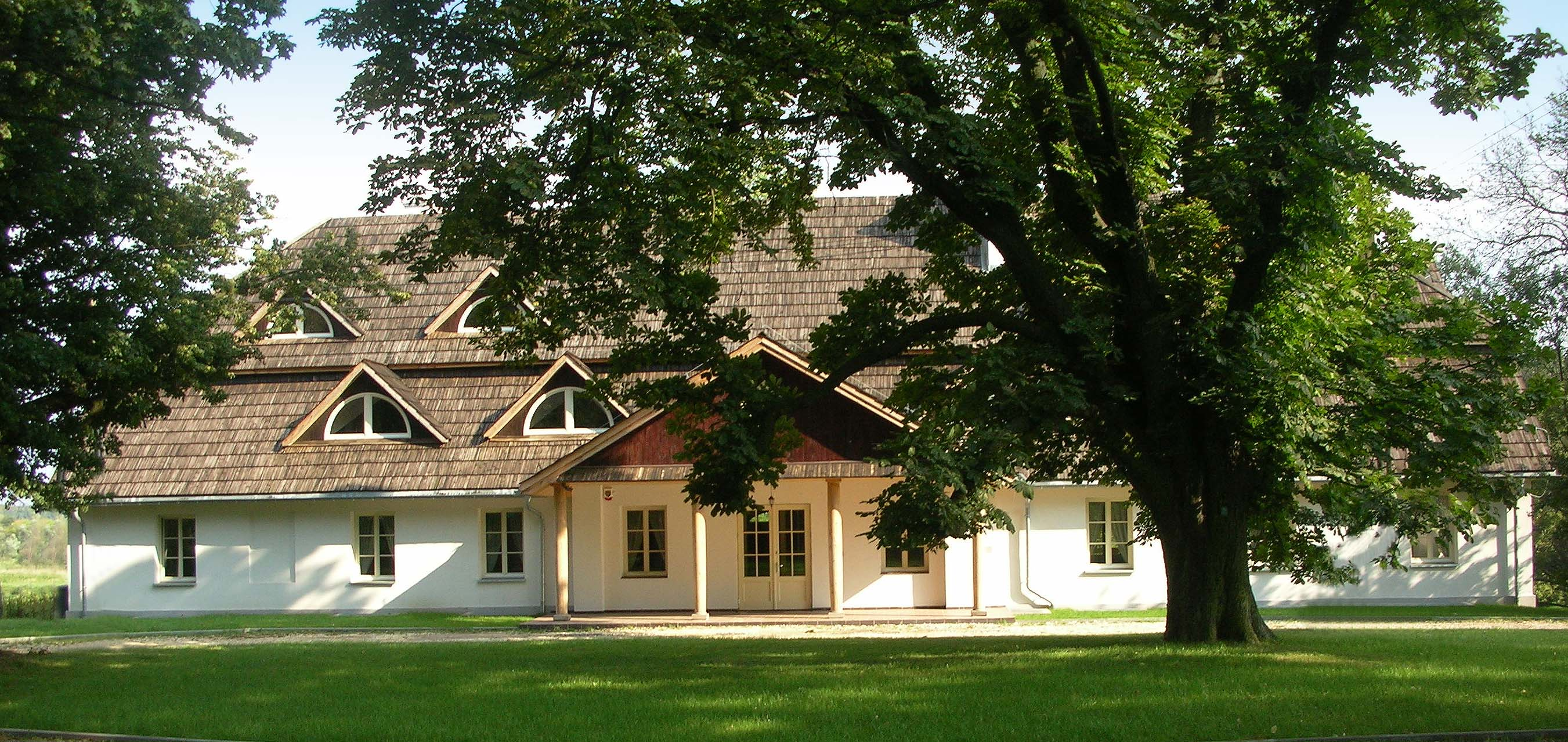

- Location within Poland
- Coordinates: 52°15′34″N 20°20′20″E
- Country: Poland
- Voivodeship: Masovian
- County: Warsaw West
- Gmina: Kampinos

Strzyżew [ˈstʂɨʐɛf] is a village in the administrative district of Gmina Kampinos, within Warsaw West County, Masovian Voivodeship, in east-central Poland.
