= Podkampinos =

- Village
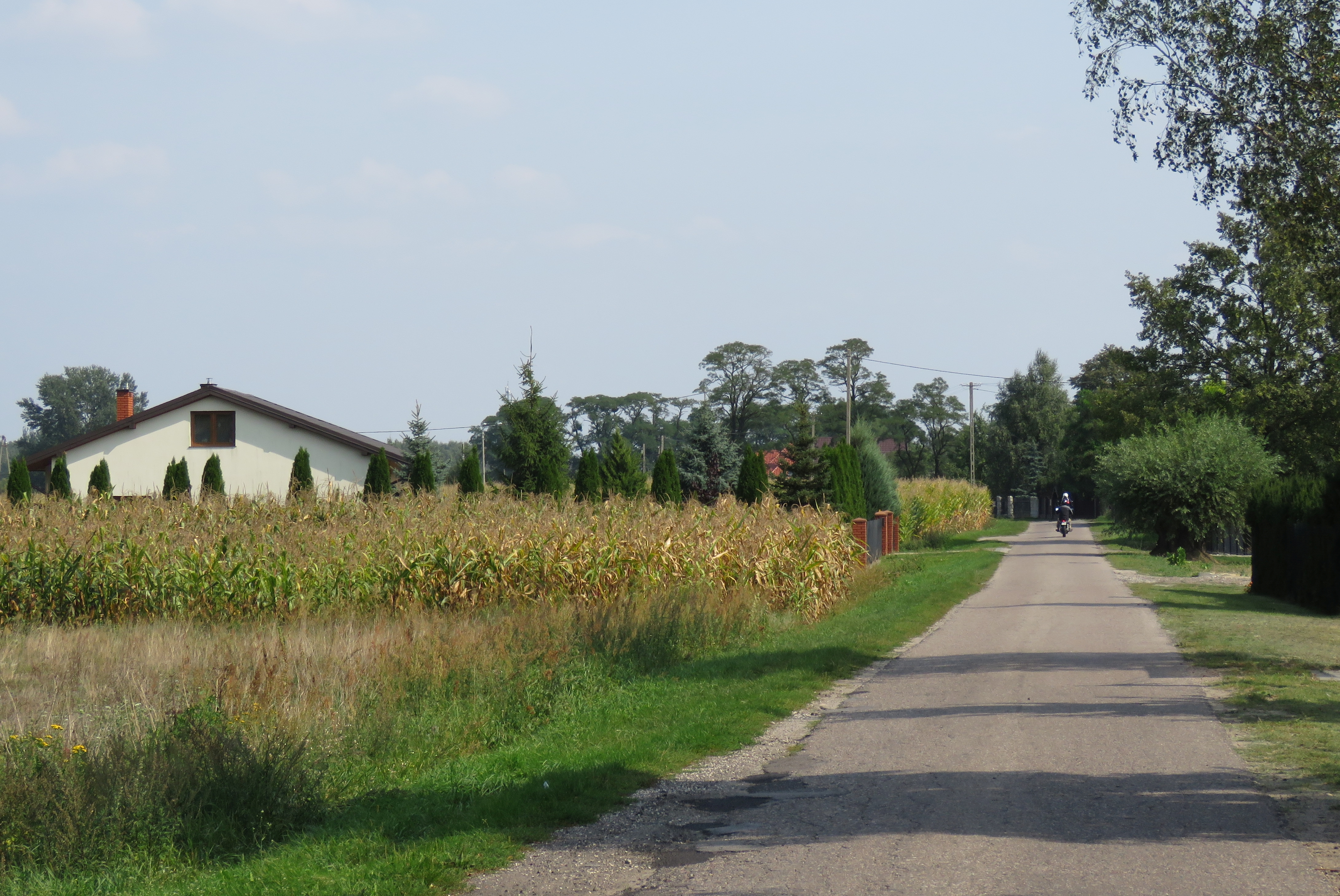
- Roadside houses in Podkampinos

- Location within Poland
- Coordinates: 52°14′31″N 20°27′09″E
- Country: Poland
- Voivodeship: Masovian
- County: Warsaw West
- Gmina: Kampinos

Podkampinos [pɔtkamˈpinɔs] is a village in the rural administrative district of Gmina Kampinos, within Warsaw West County, Masovian Voivodeship, in east-central Poland.
