= Wiejca =

- Village
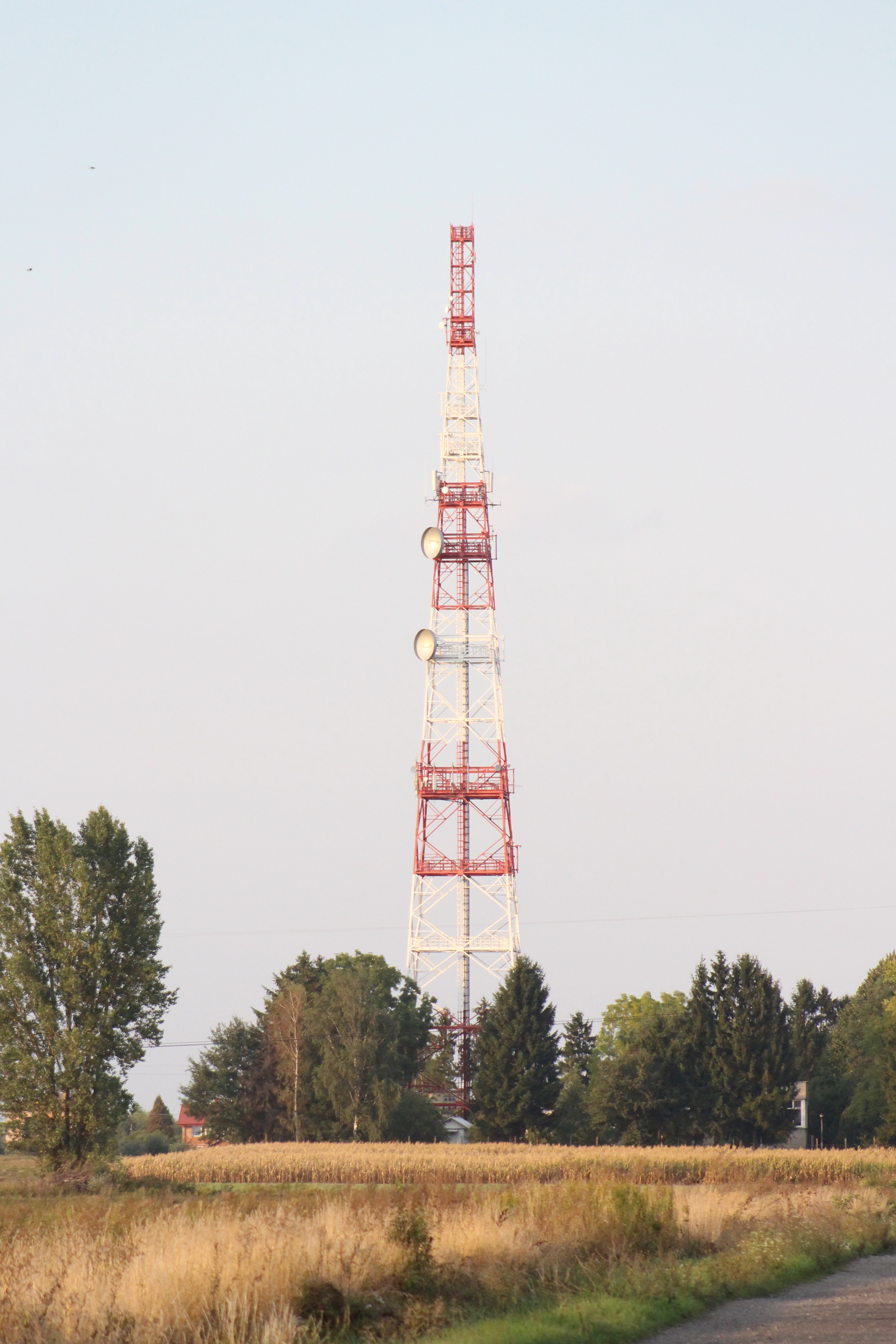
- Wiejca Radio Relay Tower

- Location within Poland
- Coordinates: 52°16′N 20°30′E
- Country: Poland
- Voivodeship: Masovian
- County: Warsaw West
- Gmina: Kampinos
- Time zone: UTC+1 (CET)
  - Summer (DST): UTC+2 (CEST)

Wiejca [ˈvjɛi̯t͡sa] is a village in the administrative district of Gmina Kampinos, within Warsaw West County, Masovian Voivodeship, in east-central Poland.

South of Wiejca at 52°15′31″N 20°29′56″E, there is a lattice tower used for radio relay links. This facility, whose Polish designation is SLR Wiecja, was used from 1974 to 1991 for the radio relay link between Warsaw and RCN Konstantynow.

Nine Polish citizens were murdered by Nazi Germany in the village during World War II.
