= Granica, Warsaw West County =

Granica
- Village
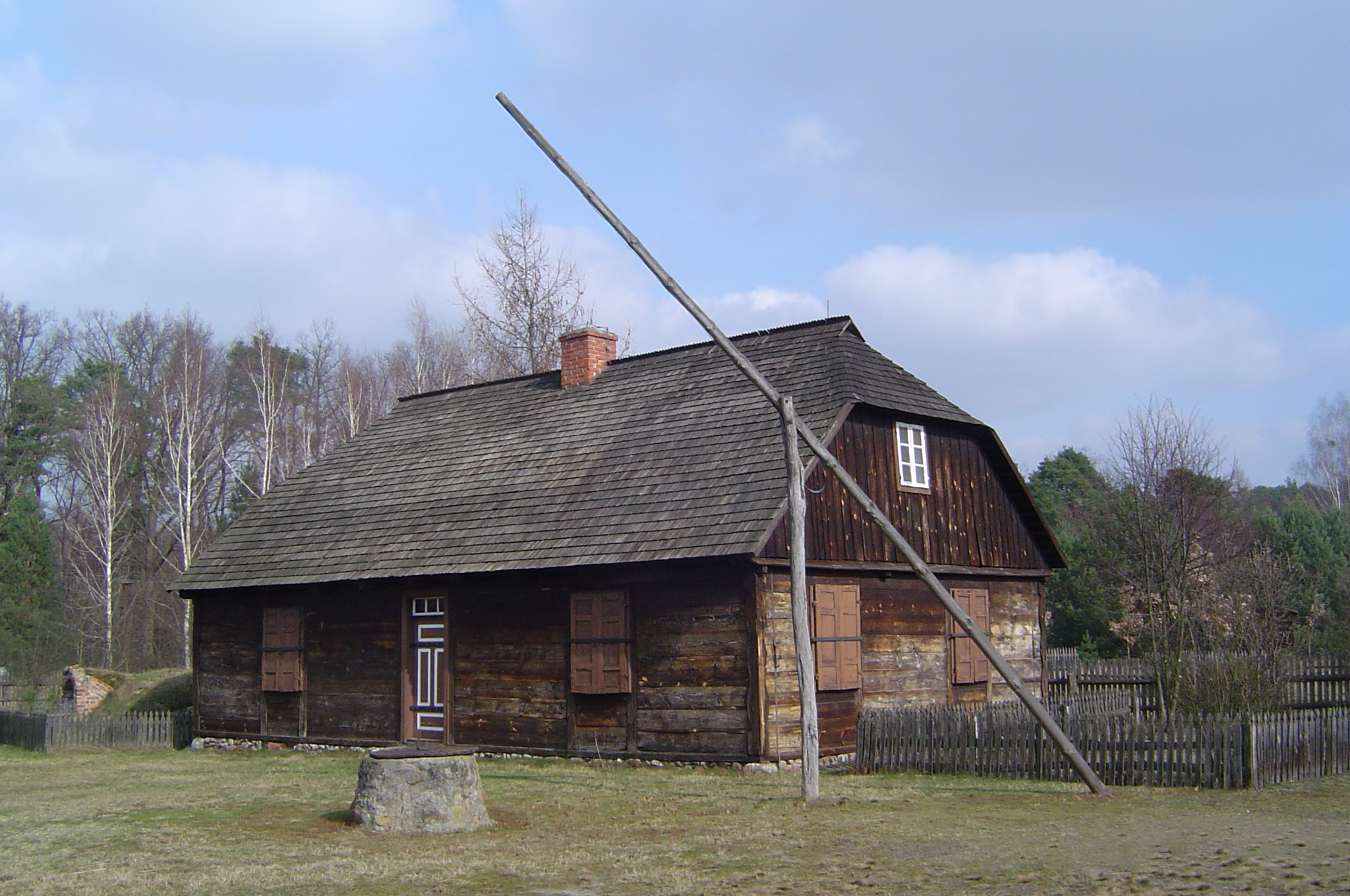
- Open-air museum in Granica

- Location within Poland
- Coordinates: 52°17′N 20°26′E
- Country: Poland
- Voivodeship: Masovian
- County: Warsaw West
- Gmina: Kampinos

Granica [ɡraˈnit͡sa] is a village in the administrative district of Gmina Kampinos, within Warsaw West County, Masovian Voivodeship, in east-central Poland.

The village is home to the Jadwiga and Roman Kobendz Educational and Museum Center, part of the Kampinos National Park. There is also an open-air museum of forest architecture (a small portion of the planned ethnographic park has been completed) and an eagle-shaped World War II cemetery.

Next to the museum is the Third Millennium Avenue, along which young oak trees were planted by President Bronisław Komorowski, among others.

Scenes for Jerzy Skolimowski's film Essential Killing were filmed in the village.
