= Pindal =

- Village
- Location within Poland
- Coordinates: 52°17′12″N 20°21′41″E
- Country: Poland
- Voivodeship: Masovian
- County: Warsaw West
- Gmina: Kampinos

Pindal [ˈpindal] is a village in the administrative district of Gmina Kampinos, within Warsaw West County, Masovian Voivodeship, in east-central Poland.
