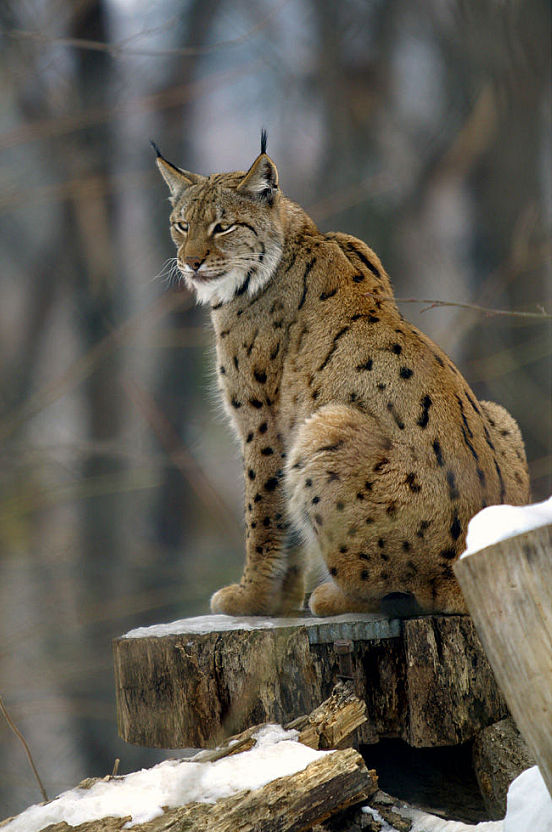
- A Northern lynx in Schönbrunn Zoo, Vienna

Conservation status
- Least Concern (IUCN 3.1) (Europe)

Scientific classification
- Kingdom: Animalia
- Phylum: Chordata
- Class: Mammalia
- Infraclass: Placentalia
- Order: Carnivora
- Family: Felidae
- Genus: Lynx
- Species: L. lynx
- Subspecies: L. l. lynx

Trinomial name
- Lynx lynx lynx (Linnaeus, 1758)

= Northern lynx =

Subspecies of carnivore

The northern lynx (Lynx lynx lynx) is a medium-sized subspecies of the Eurasian lynx (Lynx lynx).

== Range and habitat ==
The northern lynx is found in Fennoscandia, the Baltic States, the northern and central part of Poland (including Białowieża Forest and Kampinos National Park), Belarus, the European part of western, northern, central and eastern Russia, the Ural Mountains, and Western Siberia east to the Yenisei River.

== Prey of the northern lynx ==
Northern lynx prey largely on small to fairly large sized mammals and birds. Among the recorded prey items are European and mountain hares, rabbits, red squirrels, Siberian flying squirrels, dormice, mice, mustelids (such as martens), grouse, red foxes, raccoon dogs, wild boar, roe deer, moose, red deer and other medium-sized ungulates. Semi-domestic reindeer (Rangifer tarandus) are the main prey for the northern lynx in northern Scandinavia.

== Predators and enemies of the northern lynx ==
In Russian forests, the most important predator of the Eurasian lynx is the Eurasian wolf. In packs, wolves kill and eat lynxes that fail to escape into trees. Lynx populations decrease when wolves appear in a region and are likely to take smaller prey where wolves are active.

Wolverines are perhaps the most dogged of competitors for kills, often stealing lynx kills. Lynxes tend to actively avoid encounters with wolverines, but may sometimes fight them if defending kittens. Instances of predation on lynx by wolverines may occur, even perhaps on adults, but unlike wolf attacks on lynx are extremely rare if they do in fact occur. One study in Sweden found that out of 33 deaths of lynx of a population being observed, one was probably killed by a wolverine. Another known instance of predation by an adult wolverine on an adult lynx was reportedly seen in the Pechora River area, although this appeared to merely be an anecdotal claim. There are no known instances of lynx preying on a wolverine.

Eurasian brown bears, although not (so far as is known) predators of northern lynx, are in some areas semi-habitual usurpers of ungulate kills by lynxes, not infrequently before the feline has had a chance to consume its kill itself.

== See also ==
- Eurasian lynx
- Siberian lynx
- Carpathian lynx
