= Stare Gnatowice =

- Village
- Location within Poland
- Coordinates: 52°14′4″N 20°25′15″E
- Country: Poland
- Voivodeship: Masovian
- County: Warsaw West
- Gmina: Kampinos
- Population: 120

Stare Gnatowice [ˈstarɛ ɡnatɔˈvit͡sɛ] is a village in the administrative district of Gmina Kampinos, within Warsaw West County, Masovian Voivodeship, in eastcentral Poland.
