= Koca Katran =

Big old cedar of Lebanon Koca Katran Lübnan sediri
- Interactive map of Big old cedar of Lebanon; Koca Katran Lübnan sediri
- Species: Cedar of Lebanon (Cedrus libani)
- Location: Çığlıkara Nature Reserve, Elmalı, Antalya Province, Turkey
- Coordinates: 36.525301°N 29.82927°E
- Date seeded: 4 BC
- Custodian: Ministry of Forest and Water Management

Koca Katran Lübnan sediri (literally: Big old cedar of Lebanon) is a monumental old cedar of Lebanon (Cedrus libani) in Antalya Province, southern Turkey. It is a registered natural monument of the country.

Koca Katran is located within Çığlıkara Nature Reserve, a cedar forest, in Elmalı district of Antalya Province. The tree is 25 m (82 ft) high and the circumference of its trunk is 8.23 m (27.0 ft) at 2.62 m (8.6 ft) diameter.

The old tree was registered a natural monument in 1995. The age of the cedar was dated as 2000 years old when it was registered.

== See also ==
- List of individual trees
- List of oldest trees
