= Skarbikowo =

- Village
- Location within Poland
- Coordinates: 52°14′54″N 20°22′30″E
- Country: Poland
- Voivodeship: Masovian
- County: Warsaw West
- Gmina: Kampinos

Skarbikowo [skarbiˈkɔvɔ] is a village in the administrative district of Gmina Kampinos, within Warsaw West County, Masovian Voivodeship, in east-central Poland.
