= Kirsztajnów =

- Village
- Location within Poland
- Coordinates: 52°16′N 20°19′E
- Country: Poland
- Voivodeship: Masovian
- County: Warsaw West
- Gmina: Kampinos
- Elevation: 70 m (230 ft)

Kirsztajnów [kirʂˈtai̯nuf] is a village in the administrative district of Gmina Kampinos, within Warsaw West County, Masovian Voivodeship, in east-central Poland.
