= Rzęszyce =

- Village
- Location within Poland
- Coordinates: 52°16′32″N 20°21′33″E
- Country: Poland
- Voivodeship: Masovian
- County: Warsaw West
- Gmina: Kampinos
- Population: 60

Rzęszyce [ʐɛ̃ˈʂɨt͡sɛ] is a village in the administrative district of Gmina Kampinos, within Warsaw West County, Masovian Voivodeship, in east-central Poland.
