= Bieliny, Warsaw West County =

Bieliny
- Village
- Location within Poland
- Coordinates: 52°18′22″N 20°26′15″E
- Country: Poland
- Voivodeship: Masovian
- County: Warsaw West
- Gmina: Kampinos

Bieliny [bjɛˈlinɨ] is a village in the administrative district of Gmina Kampinos, within Warsaw West County, Masovian Voivodeship, in east-central Poland.
