= Wola Pasikońska =

- Village
- Location within Poland
- Coordinates: 52°15′N 20°22′E
- Country: Poland
- Voivodeship: Masovian
- County: Warsaw West
- Gmina: Kampinos
- Population: 260

Wola Pasikońska [ˈvɔla paɕiˈkɔɲska] is a village in the administrative district of Gmina Kampinos, inside Warsaw West County, Masovian Voivodeship, in east-central Poland.
