= Łazy Leśne =

- Village
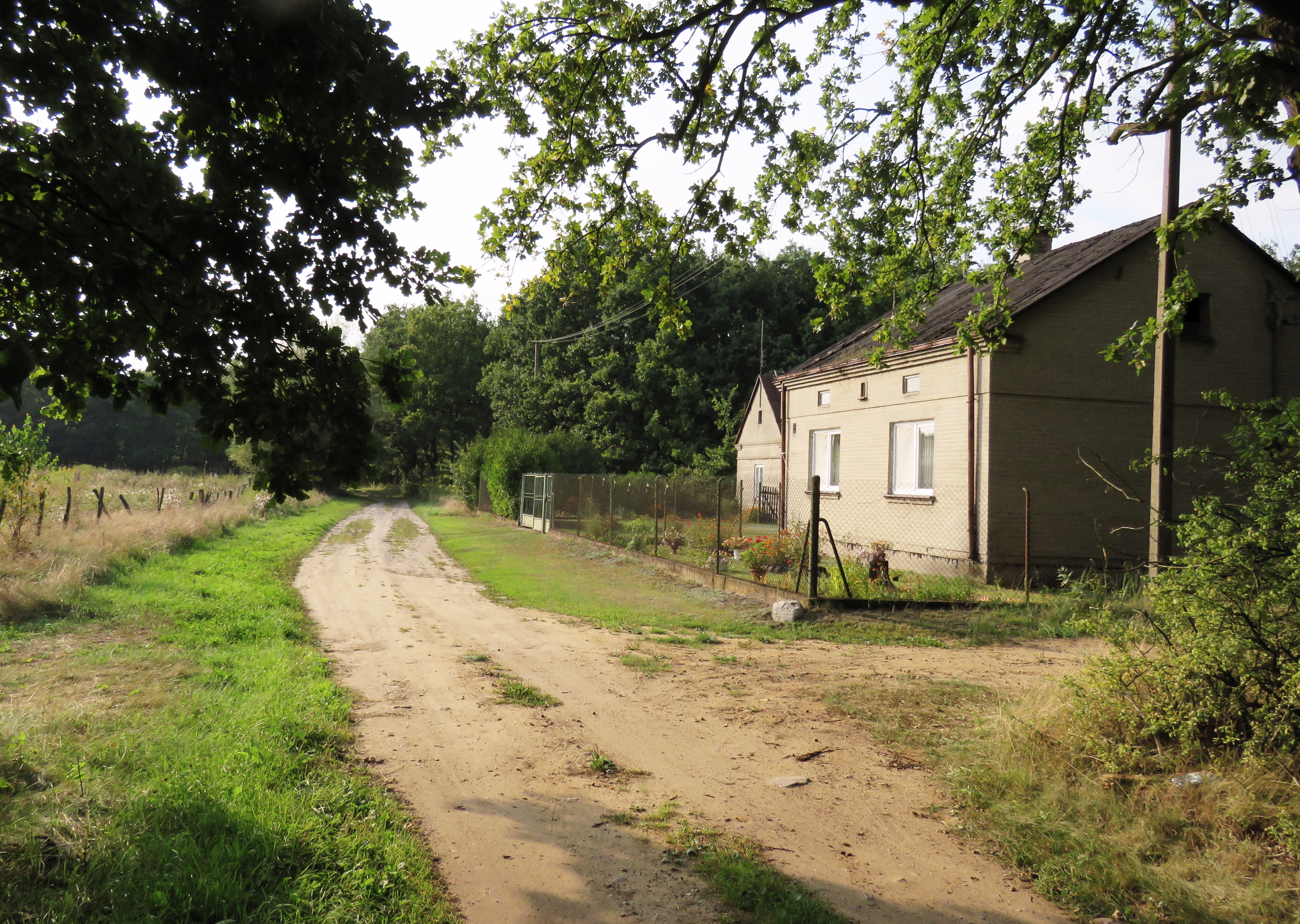

- Location within Poland
- Coordinates: 52°17′35″N 20°24′44″E
- Country: Poland
- Voivodeship: Masovian
- County: Warsaw West
- Gmina: Kampinos
- Time zone: UTC+1 (CET)
  - Summer (DST): UTC+2 (CEST)

Łazy Leśne [ˈwazɨ ˈlɛɕnɛ] is a village in the administrative district of Gmina Kampinos, within Warsaw West County, Masovian Voivodeship, in east-central Poland.

Six Polish citizens were murdered by Nazi Germany in the village during World War II.
