= Koszówka =

- Village
- Location within Poland
- Coordinates: 52°16′N 20°28′E
- Country: Poland
- Voivodeship: Masovian
- County: Warsaw West
- Gmina: Kampinos

Koszówka [kɔˈʂufka] is a village in the administrative district of Gmina Kampinos, within Warsaw West County, Masovian Voivodeship, in east-central Poland.
