= Strojec, Masovian Voivodeship =

Strojec
- Village
- Location within Poland
- Coordinates: 52°16′20″N 20°20′56″E
- Country: Poland
- Voivodeship: Masovian
- County: Warsaw West
- Gmina: Kampinos

Strojec [ˈstrɔjɛt͡s] is a village in the administrative district of Gmina Kampinos, within Warsaw West County, Masovian Voivodeship, in east-central Poland.
