= Kwiatkówek, Masovian Voivodeship =

Kwiatkówek
- Village
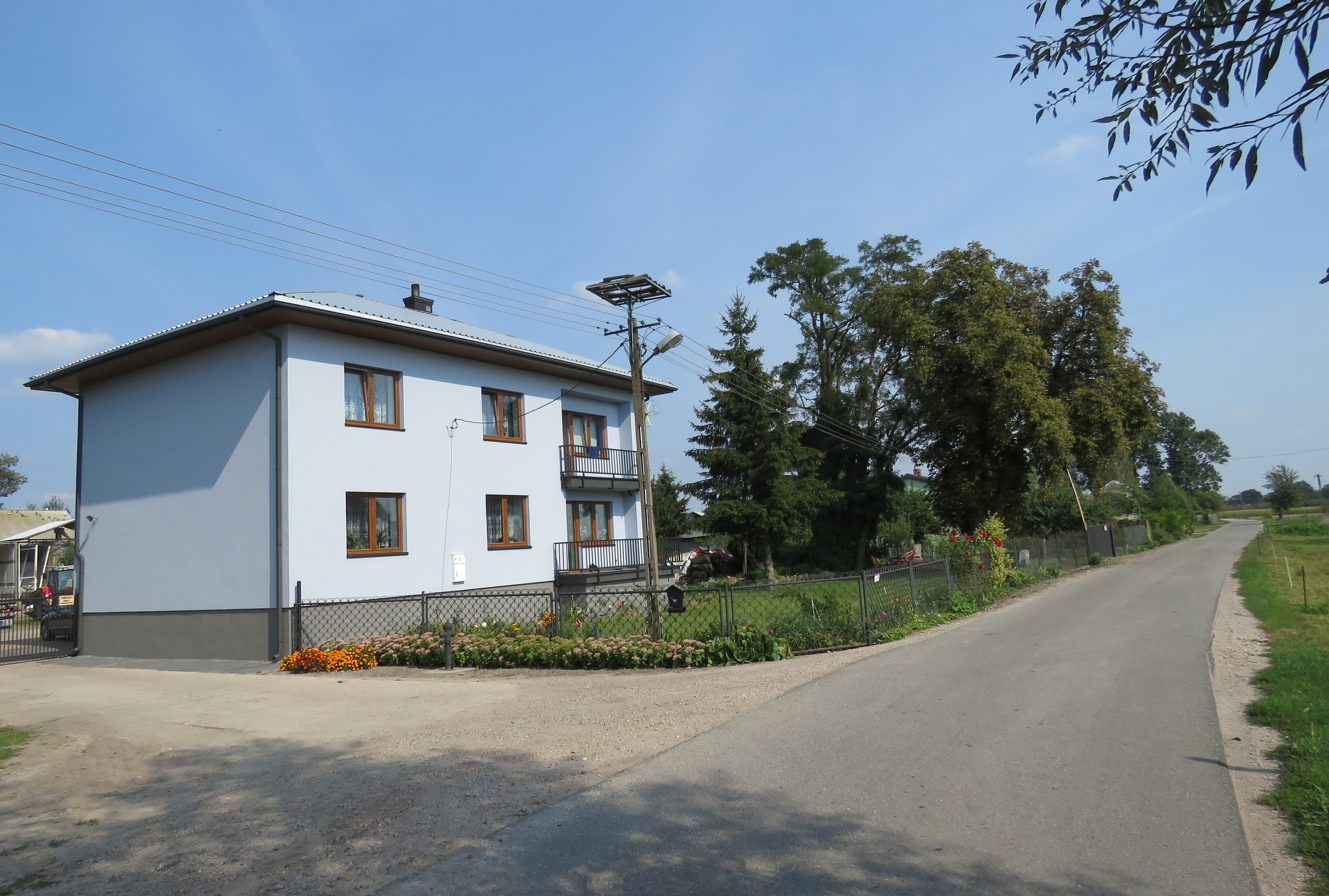

- Location within Poland
- Coordinates: 52°15′23″N 20°26′19″E
- Country: Poland
- Voivodeship: Masovian
- County: Warsaw West
- Gmina: Kampinos

Kwiatkówek [kfjatˈkuvɛk] is a village in the administrative district of Gmina Kampinos, within Warsaw West County, Masovian Voivodeship, in east-central Poland.
