= Gmina Kampinos =

Gmina Kampinos Kampinos Commune
- Gmina
- Coat of arms
- Interactive map of Gmina Kampinos
- Coordinates (Kampinos): 52°16′N 20°27′E
- Country: Poland
- Voivodeship: Masovian
- County: Warsaw West
- Seat: Kampinos

Area
  - Total: 84.25 km^{2} (32.53 sq mi)

Population (2013)
  - Total: 4,291
  - Density: 50.93/km^{2} (131.9/sq mi)
- Website: https://www.kampinos.pl/

Gmina Kampinos is a rural gmina (administrative district) in Warsaw West County, Masovian Voivodeship, in east-central Poland. Its seat is the village of Kampinos, which lies approximately 25 kilometres (16 mi) west of Ożarów Mazowiecki and 38 km (24 mi) west of Warsaw.

The gmina covers an area of 84.25 square kilometres (32.5 sq mi), and as of 2006 its total population is 4,105 (4,291 in 2013).

== Villages ==
Gmina Kampinos contains the villages and settlements of Bieliny, Bromierzyk, Budki Żelazowskie, Grabnik, Granica, Józefów, Kampinos, Kampinos A, Kirsztajnów, Komorów, Koszówka, Kwiatkówek, Łazy, Łazy Leśne, Pasikonie, Pindal, Podkampinos, Prusy, Rzęszyce, Skarbikowo, Stare Gnatowice, Strojec, Strzyżew, Szczytno, Wiejca, Wola Pasikońska and Zawady.

== Neighbouring gminas ==
Gmina Kampinos is bordered by the gminas of Brochów, Leoncin, Leszno, Sochaczew and Teresin.
