= Çığlıkara Nature Reserve =

Nature reserve in Turkey

Coordinates: 36.5175°N 29.8454°E

- Interactive map of Çığlıkara Nature Reserve

The Çığlıkara Nature Reserve (Turkish: Çığlıkara Tabiatı Koruma Alanı) is a forest of mostly Lebanon cedar (Cedrus libani) in Antalya Province, southern Turkey. It is a registered nature reserve of the country.

It is located in Elmalı district of Antalya Province. It covers an area of 15,889 ha (39,260 acres). It is home to nearly 400 plant species, among them endemic flora and seven as natural monument registered old trees. The forest was registered a nature reserve on July 5, 1991.

== Trees of natural monument ==
- Koca Katran Lübnan sediri, Big old cedar of Lebanon (Cedrus libani)
