= Kampinos National Park =

National park in Poland

- Kampinoski Park Narodowy
- IUCN category II (national park)
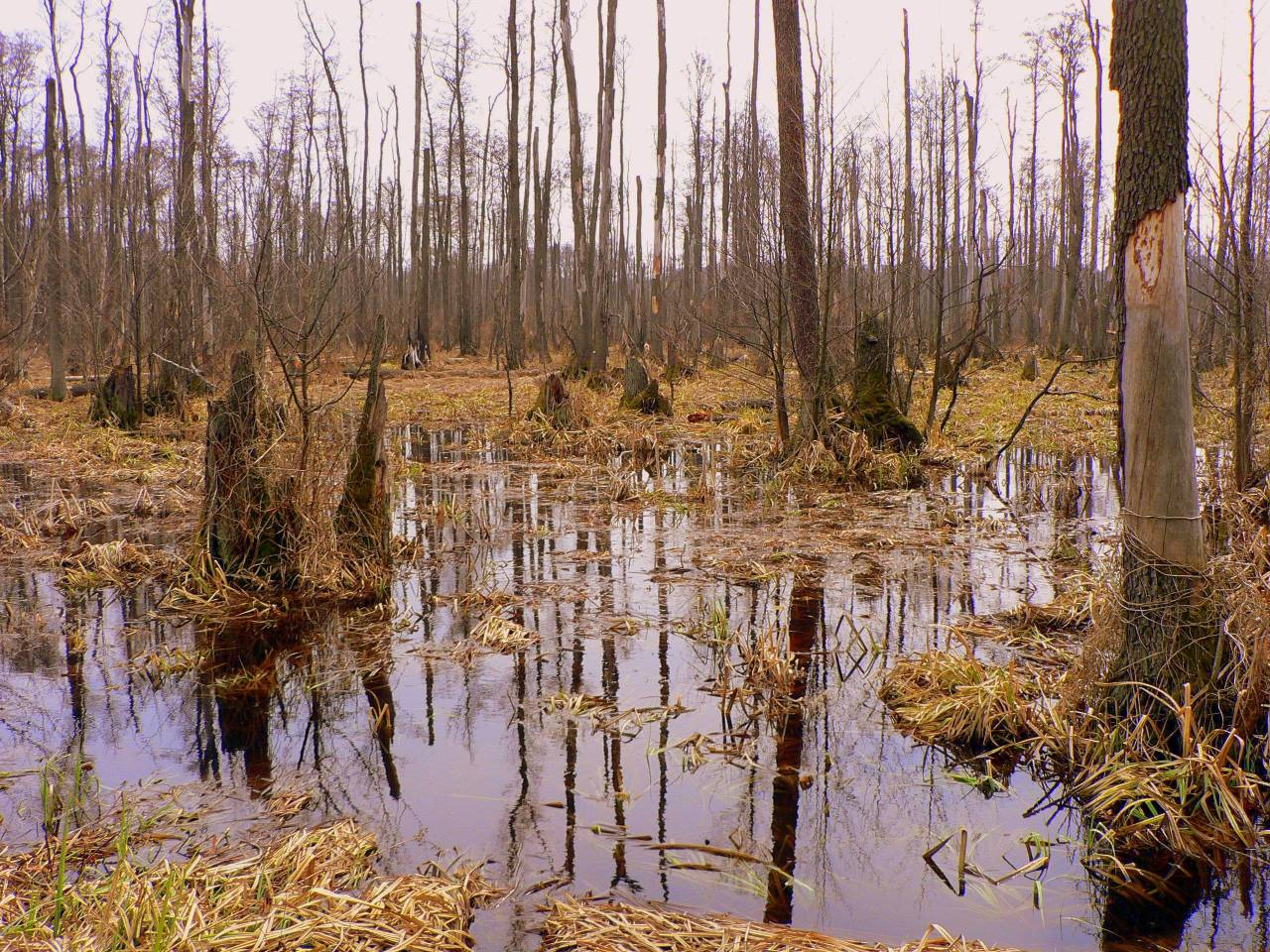
- Swamps in Kampinos Forest

- Location within Masovian Voivodeship Location within Poland
- Location: Mazovian Voivodeship, Poland
- Coordinates: 52°19′N 20°35′E
- Area: 385.44 km^{2} (148.82 sq mi)
- Established: 1959
- Governing body: Ministry of the Environment
- Website: Official website

Kampinos National Park (Polish: Kampinoski Park Narodowy) is a national park in east-central Poland, in Masovian Voivodeship, on the northwest outskirts of Warsaw. It is Poland's second-largest national park by area and the only national park in the Masovian Voivodeship. It has a sister park agreement with Indiana Dunes National Park, Indiana, United States.

The idea of creating a park in the area was first proposed in the 1920s. In the 1930s, the first forest reserves were opened: Granica, Sieraków and Zamczysko. Today, these reserves are much larger and are strictly protected.

The park was created in 1959, covering a total area of 407 square kilometres (157 sq mi). It covers the ancient Kampinos Forest (Puszcza Kampinoska). In January 2000 the area was added to UNESCO’s list of biosphere reserves. The park is now slightly smaller than it was at its founding, currently covering 385.44 square kilometres (148.82 sq mi), of which 46.38 square kilometres (17.91 sq mi) is strictly protected. The protective zone around the park covers 377.56 square kilometres (145.78 sq mi). Forests account for around 73% of the park's area, and the most common tree is the pine. The park's landscapes also include a mix of sand dunes and swamplands with pine trees growing on sand and meadows on swamps. Kampinos National Park's emblem features a moose, since it is one of the three locations with the largest moose populations in Poland, along with the Biebrza National Park and Polesian National Park.

Kampinoski National Park is located at the biggest river junction in Poland, where the valleys of the Vistula (and its tributary Bzura) and Narew (and its tributaries Bug and Wkra) meet. The park's longest river, at 35 km, is the Łasica canal, a tributary of the Bzura.

The park is home to around 1,400 species of vascular plants, including 74 tree species, and around 150 species of bryophytes. Together with the nearby valley of the Vistula, the park is also an important ecosystem for many animals. It is estimated to host around 16,500 different species of animals, though only around 4,200 of those have been documented by biologists so far, suggesting that the park's biodiversity has been very much underexplored. About 4,000 of the documented species are invertebrates, though over 200 bird species have been discovered as well. Three mammal species have been reintroduced into the park in modern times: the moose in 1951, the Eurasian beaver in 1980, and the Eurasian lynx in 1992.

Many important events connected with Polish history took place in the park. Reminders of the past are numerous and include tombs of insurrectionists from the 1863 anti-Russian uprising, war cemeteries from the Polish-German war of 1939 and tombs of members of the anti-German resistance (1944–1945). At the Palmiry cemetery lay many inhabitants of Warsaw who were secretly killed by Nazi German forces in the years 1939–1945. At Żelazowa Wola on the outskirts of the park, there is a manor house where famous composer Frédéric Chopin was born.

The park has around 360 kilometres (220 mi) of walking trails and 200 kilometres (120 mi) of cycling trails. There are also 10 educational trails introducing some particularly attractive areas. Some areas are also open for horseback riding and cross-country skiing.

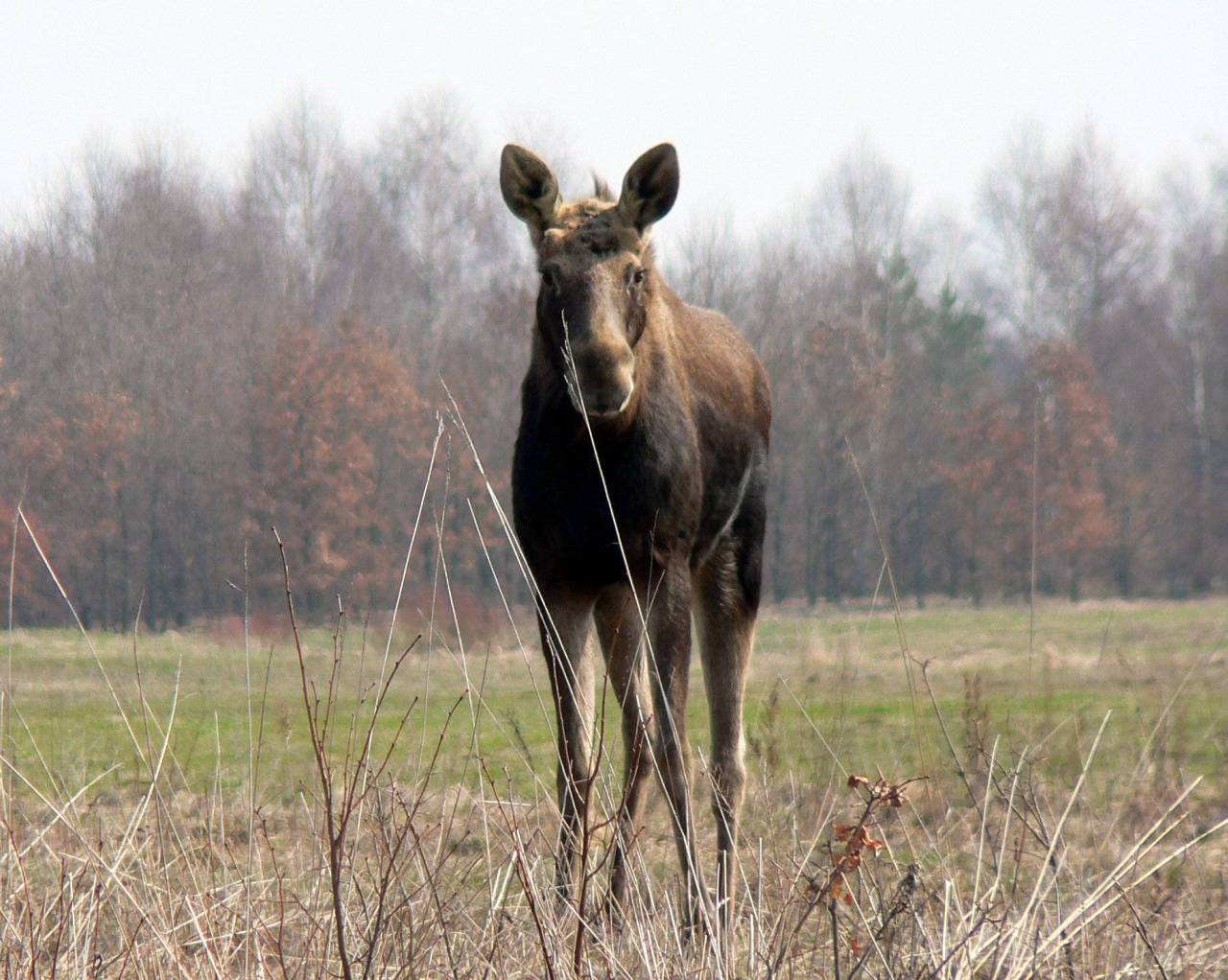
Moose

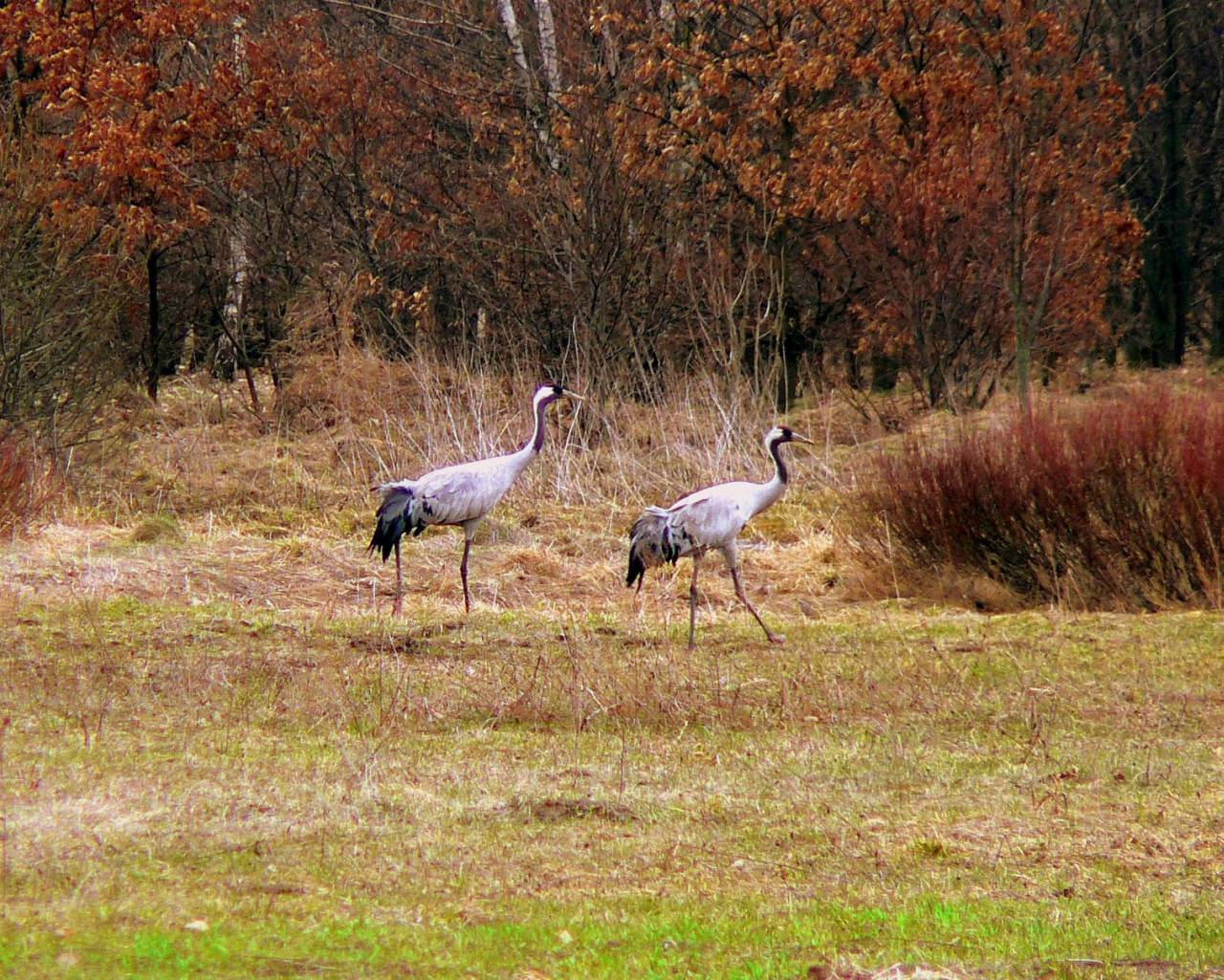
Common cranes

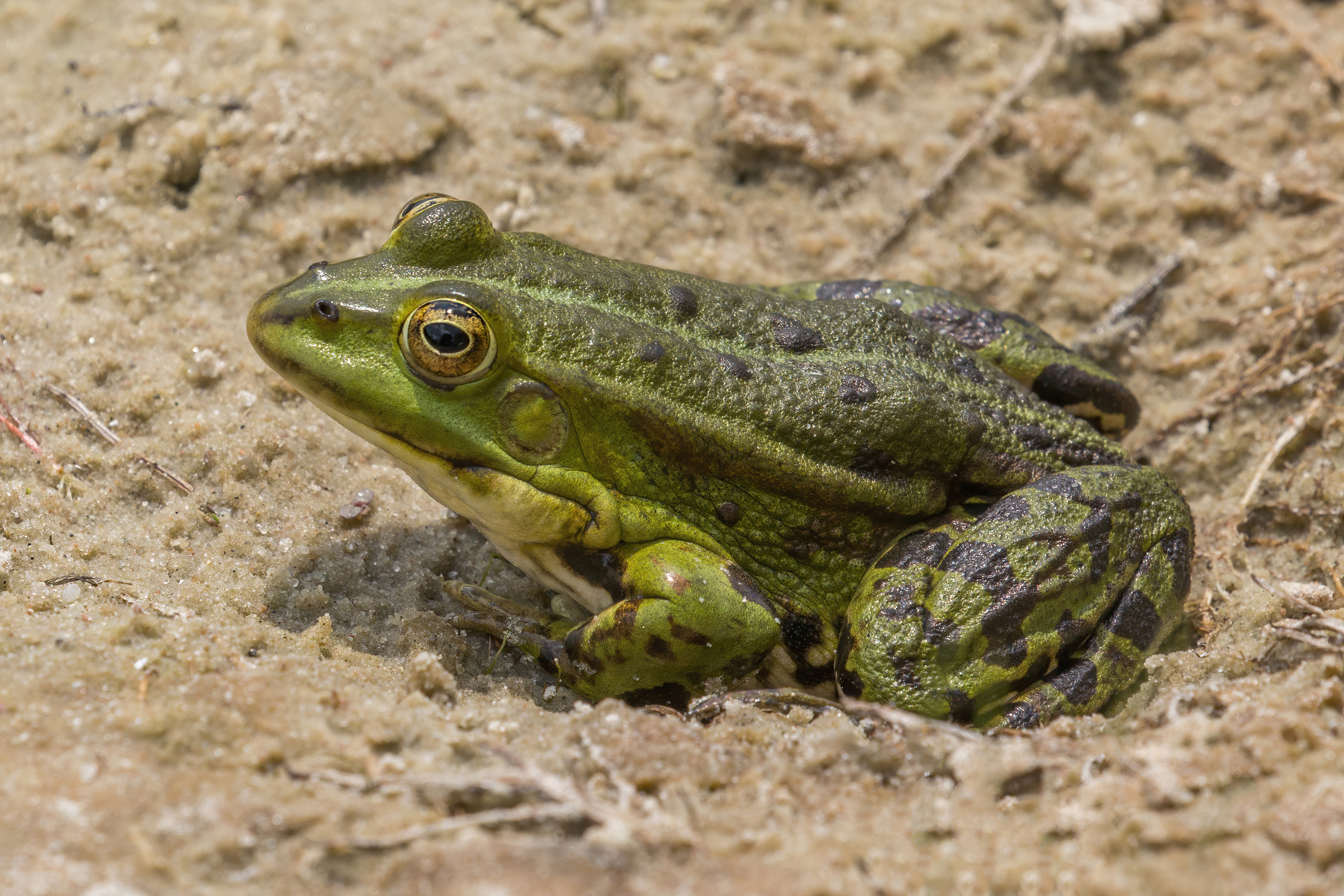
Marsh frog

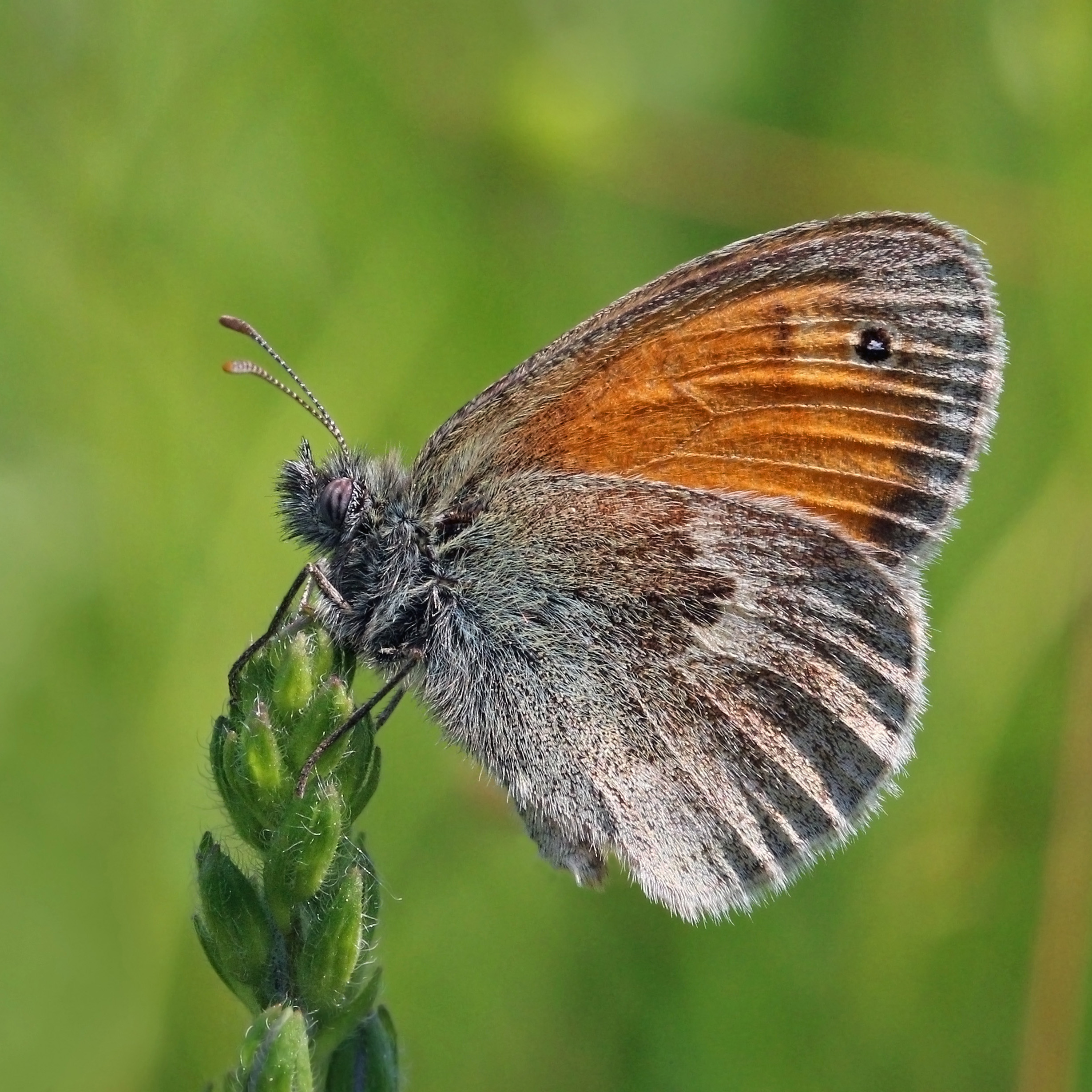
Small heath butterfly

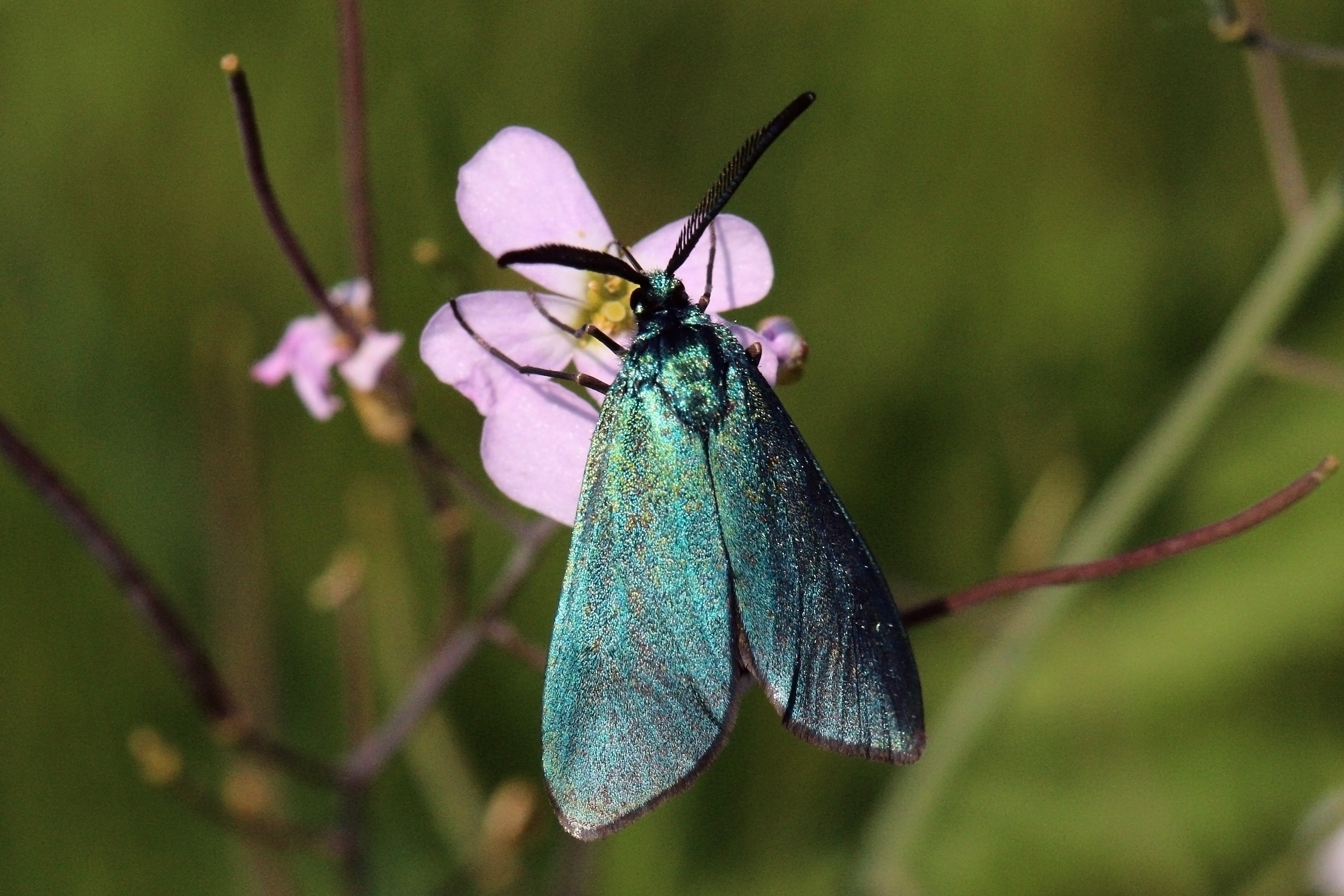
Green forester moth

== See also ==
- Parks in Masovian Voivodeship
- Special Protection Areas in Poland
- Natura 2000 in Poland
