= Rogalski =

Rogalski (feminine: Rogalska; plural: Rogalscy) is a Polish locational surname, which means a person from Rogal in Poland. The name may refer to:

- Bogusław Rogalski (born 1972), Polish politician
- Edward Rogalski (born 1942), American university administrator
- Franz Rogalski (1913–1977), German soldier
- Jerzy Rogalski (born 1948), Polish actor
- Joe Rogalski (1912–1951), American baseball player
- Maciej Rogalski (born 1980), Polish football player
- Maksymilian Rogalski (born 1983), Polish football player
- Michał Rogalski (born 1987), Polish badminton player
- Richard Rogalski, American economist
- Stanisław Rogalski (1904–1976), Polish aircraft designer
- Theodor Rogalski (1901–1954), Romanian musician

== See also ==
- Rogal (disambiguation)
- Rogala, Polish surname
- Rogale (disambiguation)
