= Port Polska =

Planned transport hub in central Poland

- IATA: none; ICAO: none

Summary
- Airport type: Public
- Operator: Centralny Port Komunikacyjny Sp. z o.o.
- Serves: Warsaw
- Location: Gmina Baranów, Grodzisk, Mazovia
- Opened: 2032 (planned)
- Hub for: LOT Polish Airlines
- Coordinates: 52.1333°N 20.4833°E
- Website: https://portpolska.pl/pl/

Map
- Location of airport in Poland

Port Polska (previously Centralny Port Komunikacyjny, CPK) is a planned major infrastructure project in Poland aimed at the construction of a new international airport and the development of a nationwide integrated transport network. The airport is planned to be located approximately 40 kilometres (25 mi) southwest of Warsaw, connected to a new high-speed rail network and controlled-access highway system linking it with much of the rest of the country.

The project was approved by the Polish Government in November 2017, but it was reassessed by the October 15 Coalition after the 2023 Polish parliamentary election. In June 2024, the coalition government confirmed that the airport element of the project would continue. As of November 2024, construction is planned to begin in 2026, with the airport opening no earlier than 2032. The combined cost of the air and rail elements is expected to be 131 billion Polish złoty (about €30.4 billion).

The airport will be designed by Foster + Partners in collaboration with Buro Happold. Initially, the airport is planned to have two runways (each 4,000 m × 45 m), but it is expected to be expanded to four runways. The passenger terminal is planned to have an approximate floor area of 450 000 square meters. The airport will have a total of 49 aircraft stands, with 26 stands designated for narrow-body aircraft and 23 for wide-body aircraft, including 18 Multiple Apron Ramp System stands designed to handle two narrow-body aircraft or one wide-body aircraft. The airport will also have around 11 kilometers of baggage conveyor belts and up to 170 check-in desks.

Planned rail connections from the CPK would take 15 minutes to Warsaw Central railway station, 25 minutes to Łódź Fabryczna railway station, and around two hours to other major Polish cities, including Kraków, Wrocław, Poznań, and Gdańsk. A high-speed line to Frankfurt (Oder) is also planned, which would shorten travel time on the Berlin-CPK route to under 3.5 hours. The opening of the CPK may result in the closure of Warsaw Chopin Airport; however, no official decision has yet been made.

== Location ==
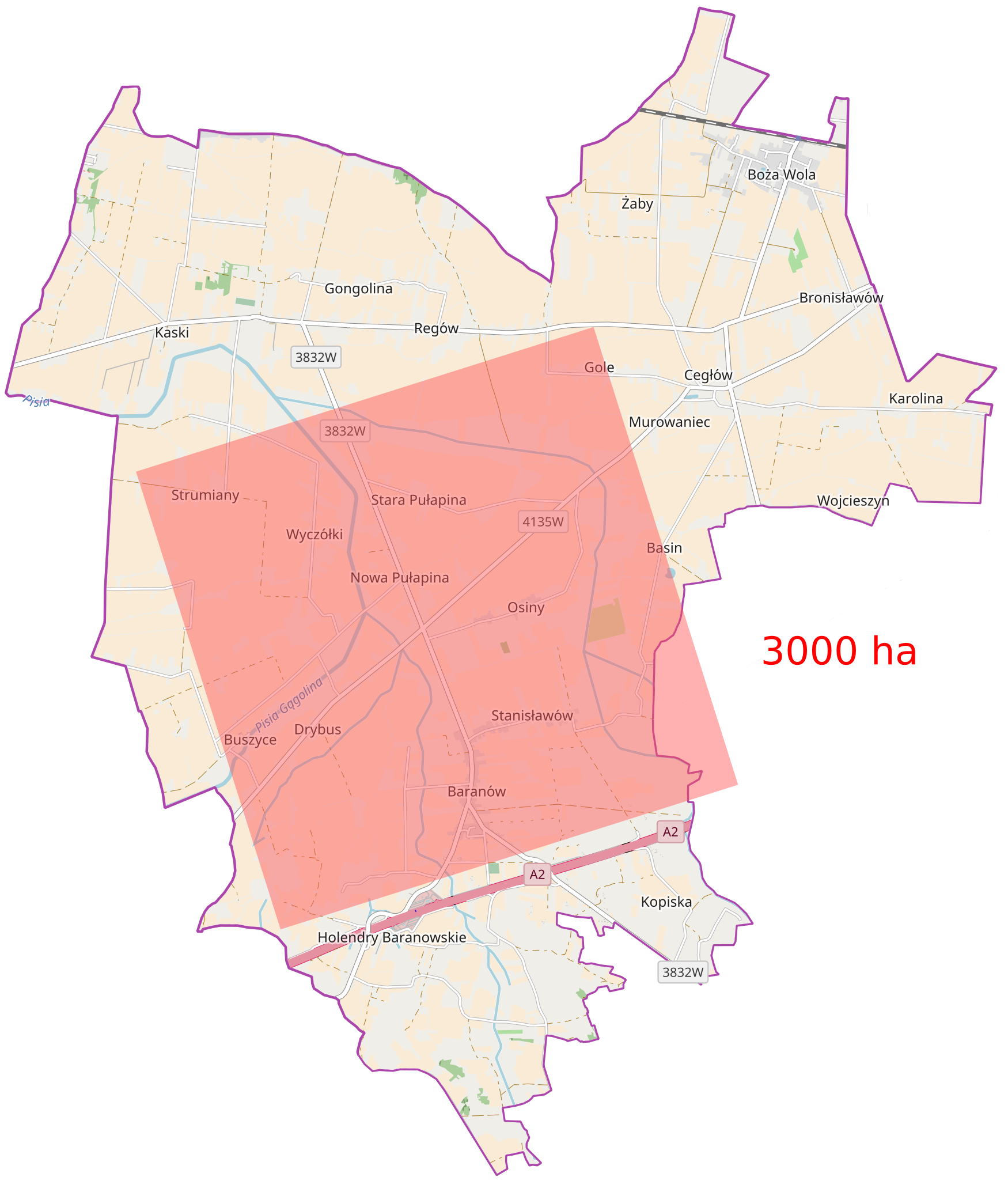
Area of the planned airport

The airport’s planned site is about 40 km west of Warsaw, next to the village of Stanisławów in Gmina Baranów, Grodzisk County. The Baranów commune occupies a significant part of Grodzisk County and, despite its rural character, has extensive road infrastructure. The A2 autostrada and railway lines run nearby, and routes toward Wrocław (Expressway S8) and Poznań (National road 92) are also close to the site.

The location was chosen after careful examination of several different areas. Before recommending Baranów, the Arup consulting company analyzed a list of potential locations, including Modlin, Wołomin, Sochaczew, Mszczonów, Babsk, Nowe Miasto nad Pilicą, Grójec, and Radom-Sadków. Experts took into account the distance from Warsaw, transport accessibility, land accessibility, and environmental restrictions, including noise levels. Analyses showed that Baranów offers an optimal location for the project.

== History ==
Discussions about a new airport to replace Warsaw Chopin Airport date back to at least 1971, during the early years of Edward Gierek's rule. In 1978, Bogusław Jankowski (died 2017) first proposed his idea of a new central airport for Poland, but it was only during the Cabinet of Leszek Miller (2001–2004) that the idea began to be seriously considered. On 12 May 2005, the Civil Aviation Office signed a contract with the Spanish consortium Ineco-Sener to carry out a feasibility study of the central airport. Such a study was nevertheless not actually carried out during the next two years, which was interpreted as a sign that the project of a new major central airport was being postponed until an indeterminate future. Nevertheless, a new airport serving Warsaw was proposed in the government's Transport Infrastructure Development Strategy for 2010–2013.

After the Law and Justice party regained power in 2015, the project gained pace, with the government approving the plan in November 2017.

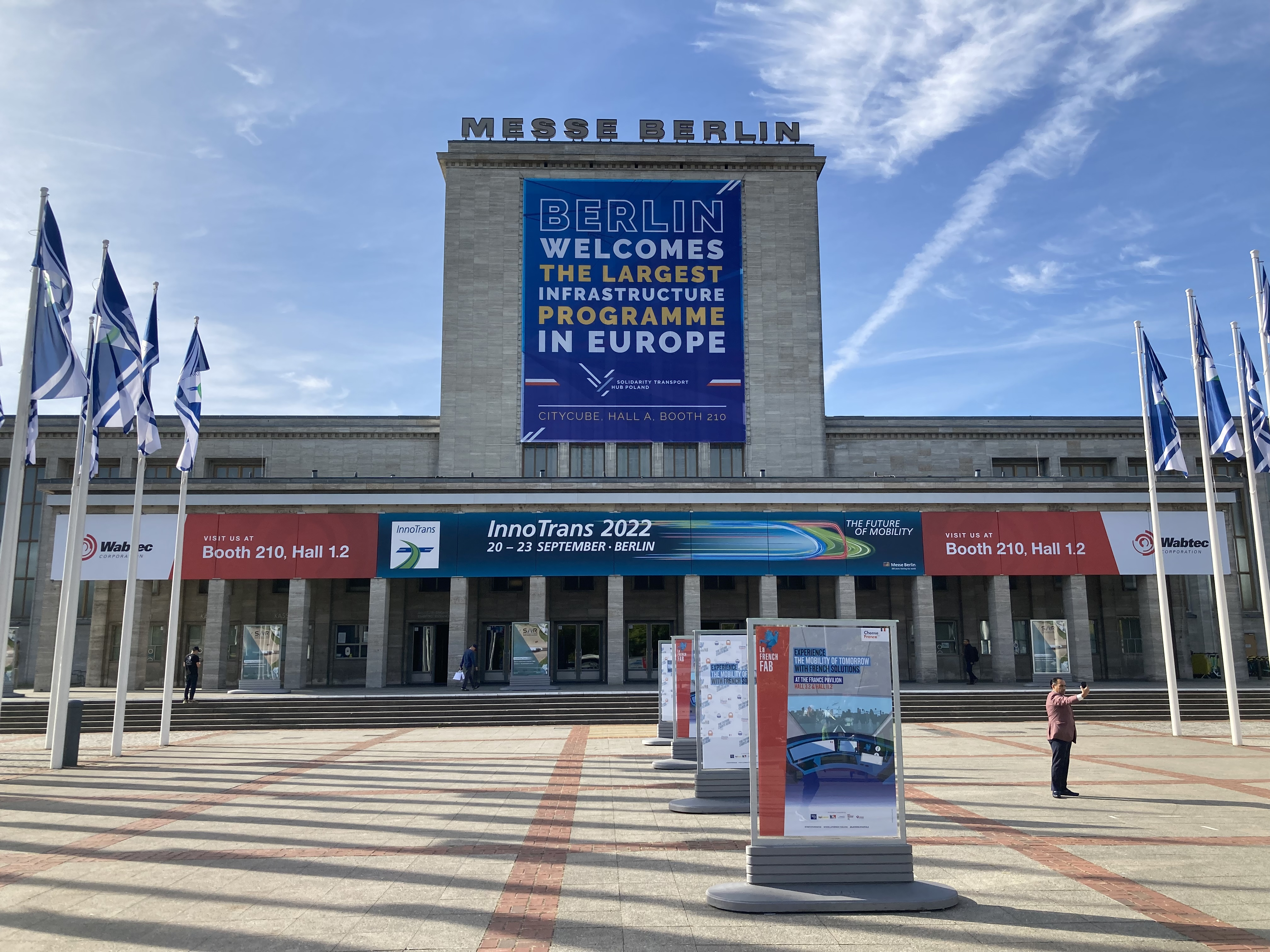
Banner "Berlin welcomes the largest infrastructure programme in Europe. Solidarity Transport Hub. Poland." InnoTrans 2022, Berlin.

On 17 June 2018, the residents of the district of Baranów, Grodzisk Mazowiecki County, voted down the plan to build the new airport. With 47 percent voter turnout, 84 percent opposed the plan. The referendum was not binding, but Deputy Infrastructure Minister Mikołaj Wild said that the voice of the public would be taken into consideration. The English name "Solidarity Transport Hub Poland" was originally proposed for the project, but was eventually phased out in 2023.

By December 2024, the management company had purchased 1,037 hectares, which is 40% of the dedicated area.

=== Architecture ===
In June 2019, the British Embassy, in conjunction with the Solidarity Transport Hub Company, held architectural workshops, inviting well-known architectural firms to share their preliminary concepts for what the project might look like. The studies are meant to serve as inspiration in preparing the master plan, and the investor is not obliged to use any of the designs. Terminal concepts were prepared by six top-name design studios: Foster + Partners, Grimshaw Architects, Chapman Taylor, Zaha Hadid Architects, Benoy, and Pascall+Watson:

- Foster + Partners proposed the construction of two terminals: a main one, shaped like a "key" and with a layout very similar to Hong Kong-Chek Lap Kok Airport (another airport project designed by Foster + Partners), plus a supplementary one with the shape of a letter "X", which would be created in the second stage. Thus, the company proposed a modular construction of the airport, which can be expanded over time and adapted to the needs of growing air traffic. Both parts are to be integrated with each other (e.g., through a shuttle line between terminals), with the second one being created when market demand justifies airport expansion.
- Grimshaw Architects came up with the concept of a "democratic hub", trying to invoke the Polish tradition, in particular to political changes after 1989 and to the history of the Solidarity movement. They envisioned the terminal as unscaled, rational in size, and devoid of the sort of megalomania that characterizes some recently built transport hubs. The idea is to reduce the transfer time and distance for passengers.
- Chapman Taylor's concept involves hiding the base part of the terminal under a massive transparent dome to be located between the two runways. As its creators explain, the round dome is a symbol of infinite unity, and thus a reference to the history of Poland.
- Zaha Hadid Architects prepared three equivalent visions of CPK, which are based on a different approach to connecting the airport with rail. All three projects share good lighting of the airport space, made possible through the use of large-surface transparent elements, as well as the incorporation of vegetation into the terminal interior, combined with a system for maintaining it in Polish climatic conditions. The first solution situates a railway junction directly below the airport, which would allow travelers to, for example, observe oncoming trains from higher levels. The second concept envisions that just the passenger part of the station will be located directly above the platforms, connecting to other elements of the airport included in the master plan. The designers also proposed a third, more futuristic solution, in which trains approach directly to separate parts of the terminals, on platforms situated at different heights.
- Benoy's proposal emphasises ecology and sustainable development. They propose to build a solid Airport City around the proposed airport. Creating such an area around the port will be made possible by hiding underground parts of roads and railways in the immediate vicinity of the airport. At the heart of the system will be a glass roof covered with a transfer hub, which will integrate various means of transport and towards which Transportation routes will lead.
- Pascall+Watson is the most general of the concepts presented. Project Director Nitesh Naidoo from Pascall+Watson presented solutions used at airports in Europe and Asia (e.g., in London, Munich, Hong Kong, and Abu Dhabi), suggesting which of them should be adapted to the needs of the proposed airport. For the purposes of the presentation, he combined the idea of a "megahub" (referring to the new airport in Istanbul) and a "multi-hub" (pointing to Singapore Changi Airport in Singapore).

In October 2024, the design of the estimated PLN 131 billion (£25 billion) airport and transport interchange was finalized by an architectural consortium led by Foster and Partners and Buro Happold. Construction work is set to begin in 2026.
