= Murowaniec =

Murowaniec may refer to the following places:

- Murowaniec, Gmina Koźminek in Greater Poland Voivodeship (west-central Poland)
- Murowaniec, Kuyavian-Pomeranian Voivodeship (north-central Poland)
- Murowaniec, Masovian Voivodeship (east-central Poland)
- Murowaniec, Gmina Szczytniki in Greater Poland Voivodeship (west-central Poland)
- Murowaniec, Pomeranian Voivodeship (north Poland)
