= Kaski =

Kaski may refer to:

== Places ==
- Kaski District, a part of Province No. 4 in Nepal
- Dąbrowa-Kaski, a village in Gmina Szepietowo, Wysokie Mazowieckie County, Podlaskie Voivodeship, Poland
- Kaski, Łódź Voivodeship, a village in Gmina Galewice, Wieruszów County, Poland
- Kaski, Masovian Voivodeship, a village in Gmina Baranów, Grodzisk County, Poland

== Other uses ==
- Kaski (surname)
- Kayseri Kaski S.K., a women's basketball club in Turkey

== See also ==
- Kasky
