= Złotniki =

Złotniki may refer to:

- Złotniki, Lower Silesian Voivodeship (south-west Poland)
- Złotniki, Kuyavian-Pomeranian Voivodeship (north-central Poland)
- Złotniki, Podlaskie Voivodeship (north-east Poland)
- Złotniki, Kutno County in Łódź Voivodeship (central Poland)
- Złotniki, Pajęczno County in Łódź Voivodeship (central Poland)
- Złotniki, Poddębice County in Łódź Voivodeship (central Poland)
- Złotniki, Lesser Poland Voivodeship (south Poland)
- Złotniki, Świętokrzyskie Voivodeship (south-central Poland)
- Złotniki, Subcarpathian Voivodeship (south-east Poland)
- Złotniki, Kalisz County in Greater Poland Voivodeship (west-central Poland)
- Złotniki, Poznań County in Greater Poland Voivodeship (west-central Poland)
- Złotniki, Opole Voivodeship (south-west Poland)

== See also ==
- Złotnik
