= Rogal =

Rogal may refer to:

- Rogal, a Polish crescent roll similar to a kifli
- Rogal świętomarciński, a crescent cake baked in Poznań, Poland for St. Martin's Day
- Rogal, Greater Poland Voivodeship, a village in Kalisz County, Poland

== See also ==
- Rogale (disambiguation)
- Rogala (disambiguation)
- Rogalski (surname)
- Hilb, Rogal & Hobbs Co., US insurance firm
