= Rogala =

Rogala is a surname. Notable people with the surname include:

- Rogala coat of arms
- Janusz (Marja Stefan Rogala) Kaluski (1924–2010), sapper in the Polish Army
- Miroslaw Rogala (born 1954), Polish-American video artist and interactive artist
- Ryszard Rogala (born 1975), Polish Paralympic powerlifter

== See also ==
- Rogal (disambiguation)
- Rogale (disambiguation)
- Rogalski
