= Pietrzyków =

Pietrzyków may refer to the following places in Poland:

- Pietrzyków, Lower Silesian Voivodeship (south-west Poland)
- Pietrzyków, Kalisz County in Greater Poland Voivodeship (west-central Poland)
- Pietrzyków, Września County in Greater Poland Voivodeship (west-central Poland)
- Pietrzyków, Lubusz Voivodeship (west Poland)
