= Buszyce =

Buszyce may refer to:

- Buszyce, Masovian Voivodeship
- Buszyce, Opole Voivodeship
