= Osiny, Grodzisk County =

Osiny
- Village
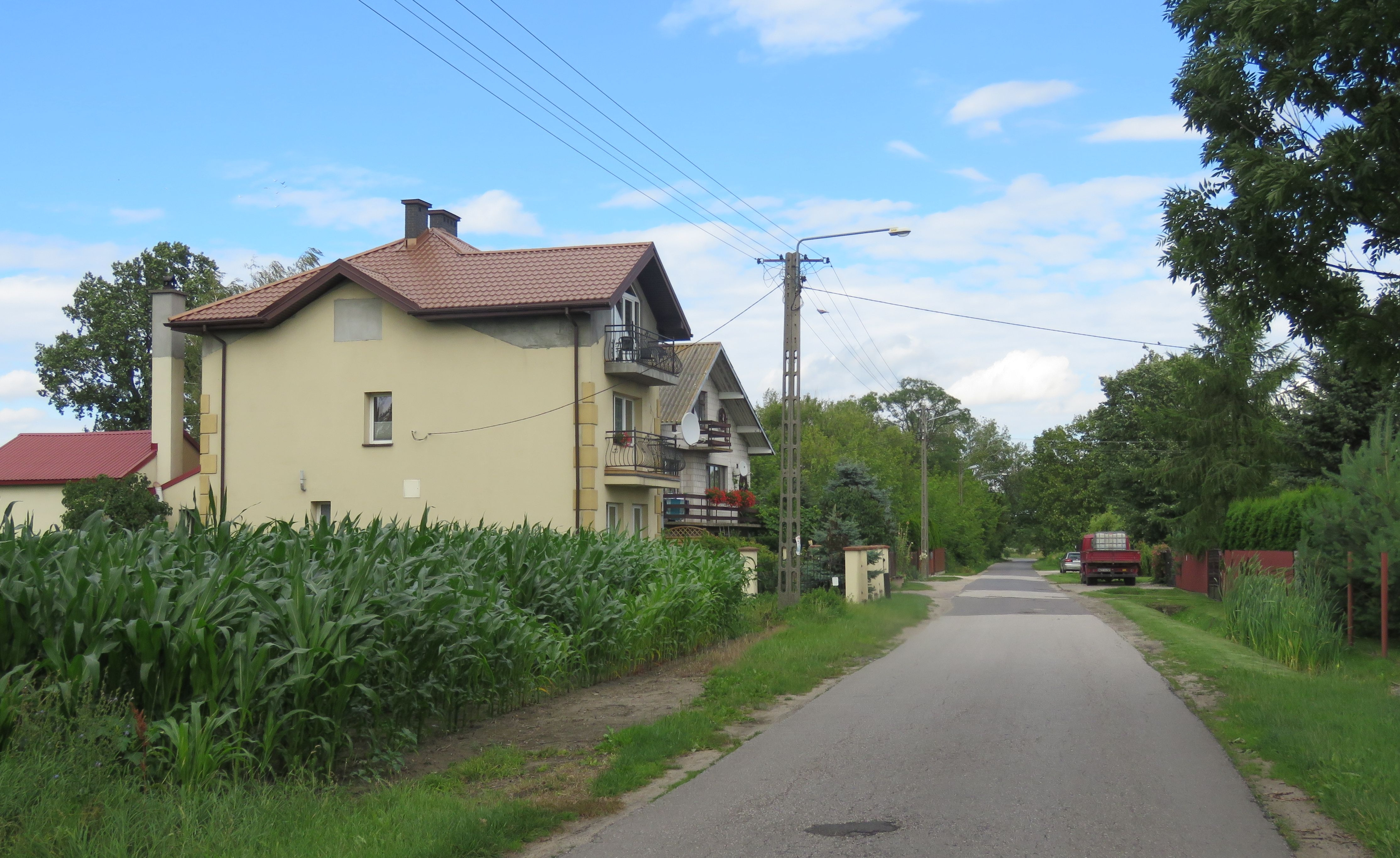

- Location within Poland
- Coordinates: 52°9′N 20°29′E
- Country: Poland
- Voivodeship: Masovian
- County: Grodzisk
- Gmina: Baranów
- Time zone: UTC+1 (CET)
  - Summer (DST): UTC+2 (CEST)
- Vehicle registration: WGM

Osiny [ɔˈɕinɨ] is a village in the administrative district of Gmina Baranów, within Grodzisk County, Masovian Voivodeship, in east-central Poland. The New Central Polish Airport is planned to be built nearby.
