= Cegłów =

Cegłów may refer to two places in Masovian Voivodeship, east-central Poland:

- Cegłów, Grodzisk County
- Cegłów, Mińsk County
