= Przydziałki =

- Village
- Location within Poland
- Coordinates: 51°46′47″N 18°21′29″E
- Country: Poland
- Voivodeship: Greater Poland
- County: Kalisz
- Gmina: Koźminek

Przydziałki [pʂɨˈd͡ʑau̯ki] is a village in the administrative district of Gmina Koźminek, within Kalisz County, Greater Poland Voivodeship, in west-central Poland.
