= Koźminek, Greater Poland Voivodeship =

Koźminek
- Town
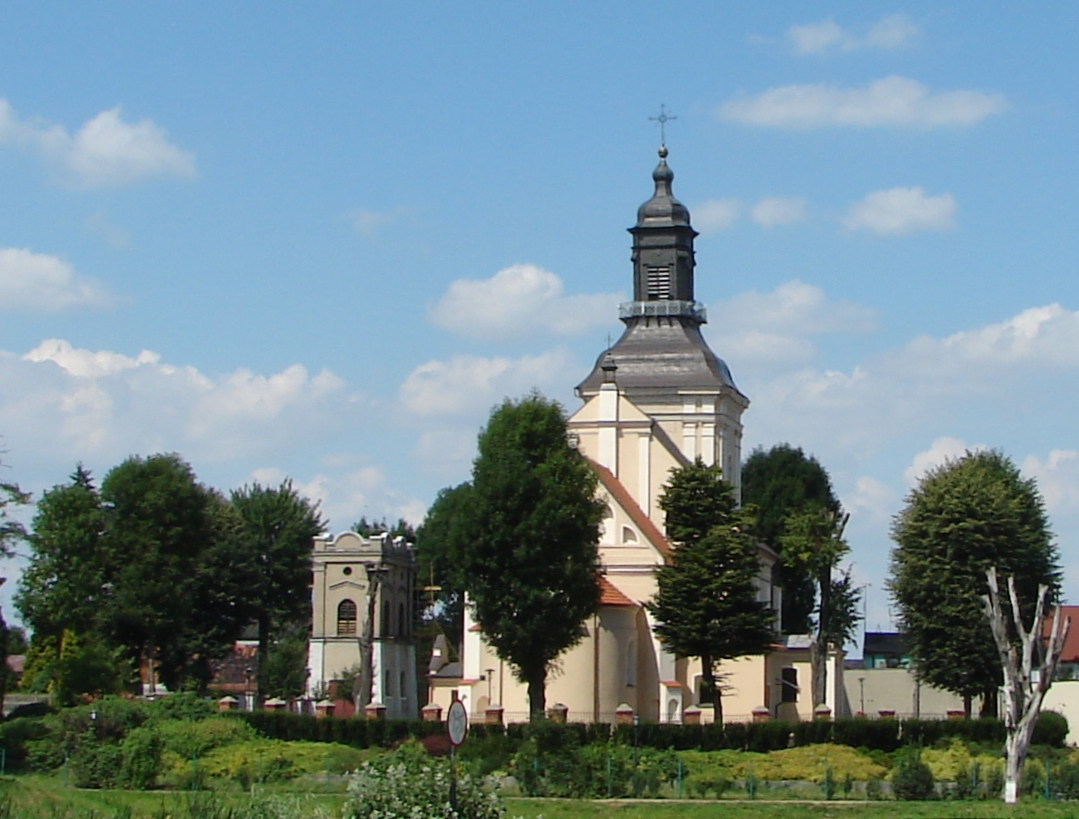
- Parish church of Saint John, built about 1400, later rebuilt many times.

- Flag Coat of arms

- Location within Poland
- Coordinates: 51°47′N 18°19′E
- Country: Poland
- Voivodeship: Greater Poland
- County: Kalisz
- Gmina: Koźminek
- Town rights: Before 1369

Population
  - Total: 1,800
- Time zone: UTC+1 (CET)
  - Summer (DST): UTC+2 (CEST)
- Postal code: 62-840
- Vehicle registration: PKA

Koźminek [kɔʑˈminɛk] is a town in Kalisz County, Greater Poland Voivodeship, in central Poland. It serves as the seat of the gmina (administrative district) called Gmina Koźminek.

The town has a population of 1,800.

== History ==
It was granted town rights before 1369.

Following the German-Soviet invasion of Poland, which started World War II in September 1939, it was occupied by Germany until 1945. The local Polish police chief was murdered by the Russians in the Katyn massacre in 1940.

== Transport ==
Koźminek lies on voivodeship road 471.

The nearest railway station is in Opatówek.
