= Gmina Baranów, Masovian Voivodeship =

Gmina Baranów Baranów Commune
- Gmina
- Coat of arms
- Interactive map of Gmina Baranów
- Coordinates (Baranów): 52°7′19″N 20°28′19″E
- Country: Poland
- Voivodeship: Masovian
- County: Grodzisk
- Seat: Baranów

Area
  - Total: 75.37 km^{2} (29.10 sq mi)

Population (2006)
  - Total: 4,855
  - Density: 64.42/km^{2} (166.8/sq mi)
- Website: http://www.gmina-baranow.pl/

Gmina Baranów is a rural gmina (municipality) in Grodzisk County, Masovian Voivodeship, in east-central Poland. Its seat is the village of Baranów, which lies approximately 10 kilometres (6 mi) west of Grodzisk Mazowiecki and 37 km (23 mi) west of Warsaw. Gmina Baranów is the most possible location for the Central Communication Port, planned to be the biggest transport hub serving Central and Eastern Europe.

The gmina covers an area of 75.37 square kilometres (29.1 sq mi), and as of 2006 its total population is 4,855.

== Villages ==
Gmina Baranów contains the villages and settlements of Baranów, Basin, Boża Wola, Bronisławów, Buszyce, Cegłów, Drybus, Gole, Gongolina, Holendry Baranowskie, Karolina, Kaski, Kopiska, Murowaniec, Nowa Pułapina, Osiny, Regów, Stanisławów, Stara Pułapina, Strumiany, Wyczółki and Żaby.

== Neighbouring gminas ==
Gmina Baranów is bordered by the gminas of Błonie, Grodzisk Mazowiecki, Jaktorów, Teresin and Wiskitki.
