= Karolina, Grodzisk County =

Karolina
- Village
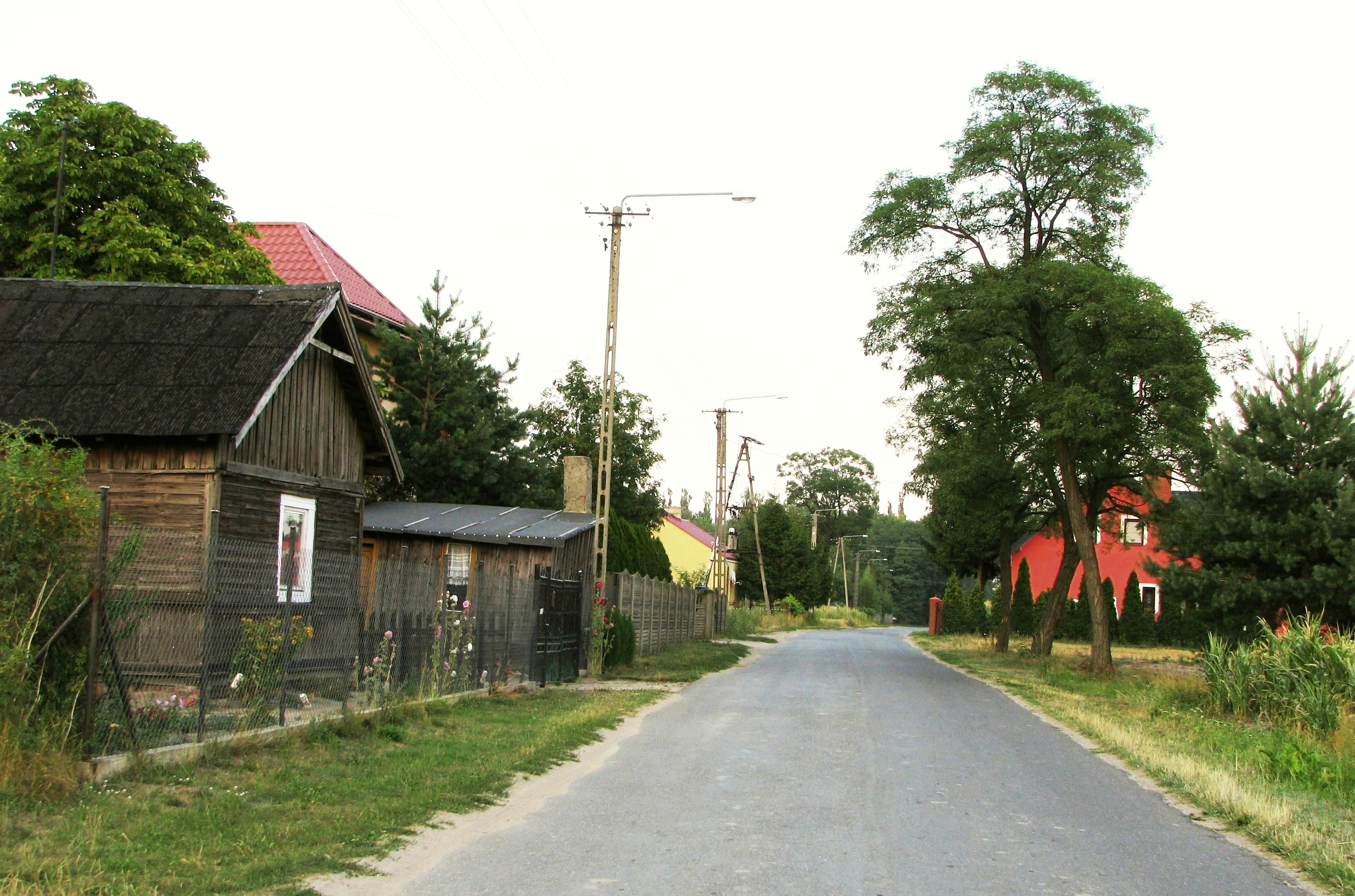

- Location within Poland
- Coordinates: 52°09′45″N 20°33′05″E
- Country: Poland
- Voivodeship: Masovian
- County: Grodzisk
- Gmina: Baranów

Karolina [karɔˈlina] (German Karlshof) is a village in the administrative district of Gmina Baranów, within Grodzisk County, Masovian Voivodeship, in east-central Poland.
