= Tymianek, Greater Poland Voivodeship =

Tymianek
- Village
- Location within Poland
- Coordinates: 51°48′21″N 18°20′38″E
- Country: Poland
- Voivodeship: Greater Poland
- County: Kalisz
- Gmina: Koźminek
- Population: 130

Tymianek [tɨˈmjanɛk] is a village in the administrative district of Gmina Koźminek, within Kalisz County, Greater Poland Voivodeship, in west-central Poland.
