= Wyczółki, Grodzisk County =

Wyczółki
- Village
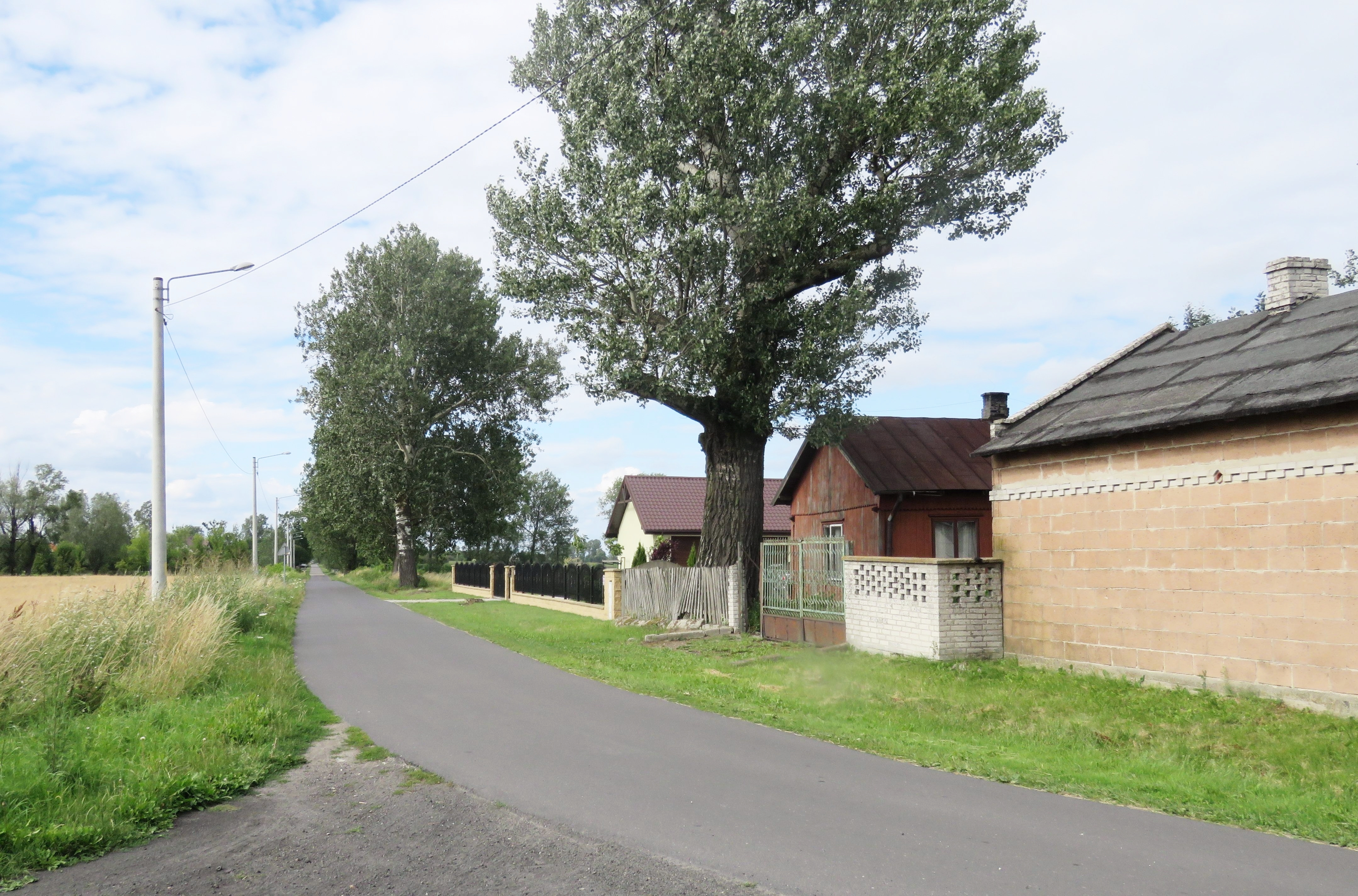

- Location within Poland
- Coordinates: 52°08′58″N 20°26′44″E
- Country: Poland
- Voivodeship: Masovian
- County: Grodzisk
- Gmina: Baranów

Wyczółki [vɨˈt͡ʂuu̯ki] is a village in the administrative district of Gmina Baranów, within Grodzisk County, Masovian Voivodeship, in east-central Poland.
