= Drybus =

- Village
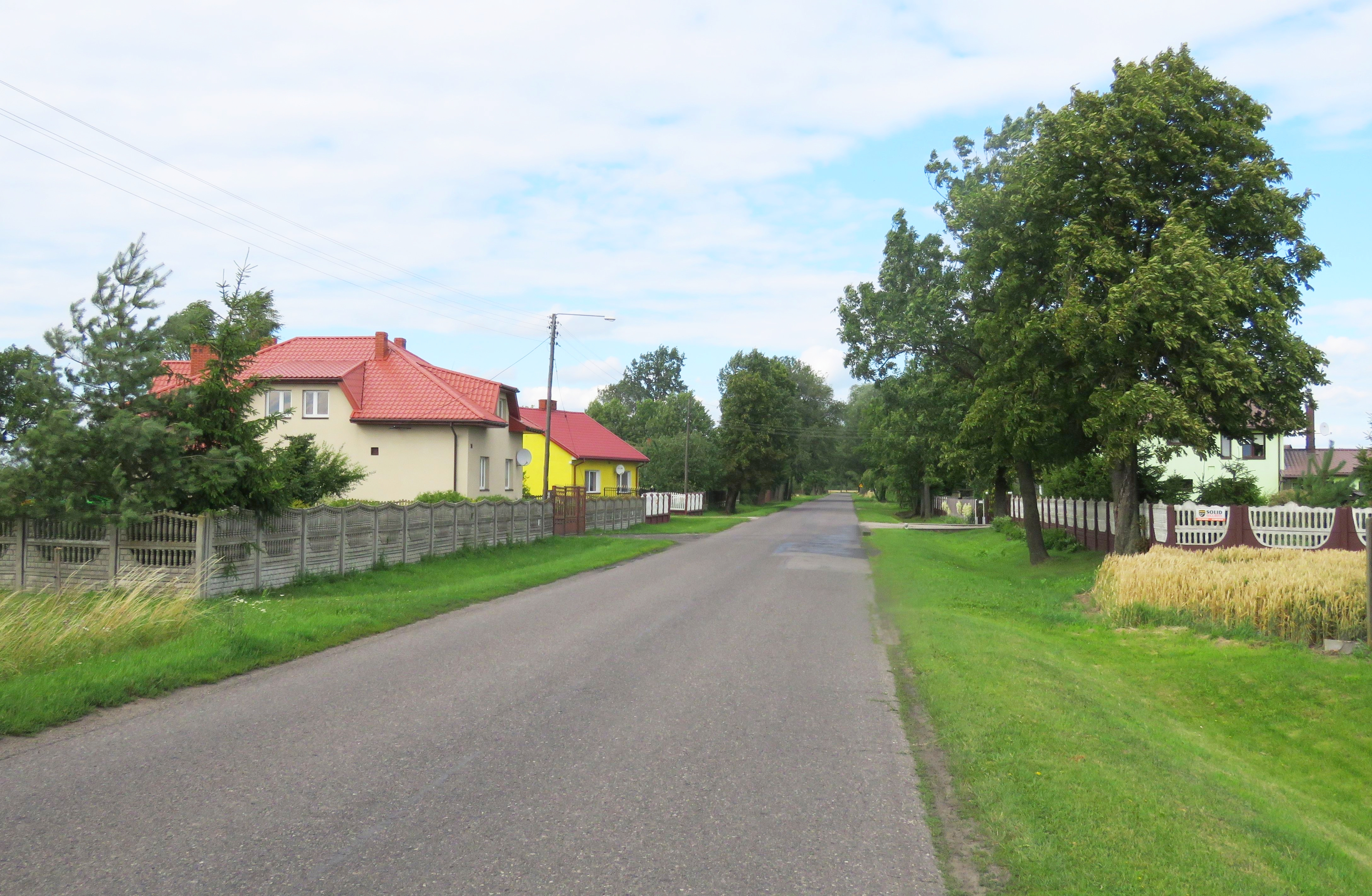
- A road in Drybus

- Location within Poland
- Coordinates: 52°07′49″N 20°26′46″E
- Country: Poland
- Voivodeship: Masovian
- County: Grodzisk
- Gmina: Baranów
- Population: 183

Drybus [ˈdrɨbus] is a village in the administrative district of Gmina Baranów, within Grodzisk County, Masovian Voivodeship, in east-central Poland.
