= Emilianów, Greater Poland Voivodeship =

Emilianów
- Village
- Location within Poland
- Coordinates: 51°48′58″N 18°19′57″E
- Country: Poland
- Voivodeship: Greater Poland
- County: Kalisz
- Gmina: Koźminek

Emilianów [ɛmiˈljanuf] is a village in the administrative district of Gmina Koźminek, within Kalisz County, Greater Poland Voivodeship, in west-central Poland.
