= Dębsko-Dosinek =

- Village
- Location within Poland
- Coordinates: 51°49′34″N 18°21′43″E
- Country: Poland
- Voivodeship: Greater Poland
- County: Kalisz
- Gmina: Koźminek

Dębsko-Dosinek [ˈdɛmpskɔ dɔˈɕinɛk] is a village in the administrative district of Gmina Koźminek, within Kalisz County, Greater Poland Voivodeship, in west-central Poland.
