= Dąbrowa, Kalisz County =

Dąbrowa
- Village
- Location within Poland
- Coordinates: 51°44′39″N 18°22′27″E
- Country: Poland
- Voivodeship: Greater Poland
- County: Kalisz
- Gmina: Koźminek
- Population: 190

Dąbrowa [dɔmˈbrɔva] is a village in the administrative district of Gmina Koźminek, within Kalisz County, Greater Poland Voivodeship, in west-central Poland.
