= Dębsko-Ośrodek =

- Village
- Location within Poland
- Coordinates: 51°49′14″N 18°21′05″E
- Country: Poland
- Voivodeship: Greater Poland
- County: Kalisz
- Gmina: Koźminek

Dębsko-Ośrodek [ˈdɛmpskɔ ɔˈɕrɔdɛk] is a village in the administrative district of Gmina Koźminek, within Kalisz County, Greater Poland Voivodeship, in west-central Poland.
