= Ksawerów, Kalisz County =

Ksawerów
- Village
- Location within Poland
- Coordinates: 51°46′N 18°21′E
- Country: Poland
- Voivodeship: Greater Poland
- County: Kalisz
- Gmina: Koźminek

Ksawerów [ksaˈvɛruf] is a village in the administrative district of Gmina Koźminek, within Kalisz County, Greater Poland Voivodeship, in west-central Poland.
