= Basin, Masovian Voivodeship =

Basin
- Wieś
- Location within Poland
- Coordinates: 52°8′46″N 20°30′28″E
- Country: Poland
- Voivodeship: Masovian
- [Powiat]: Grodzisk
- [Gmina]: [Gmina Baranów]

Basin [ˈbaɕin] is a village in the administrative district of Gmina Baranów, within Grodzisk County, Masovian Voivodeship, in east-central Poland.
