= Gać Kaliska =

- Village
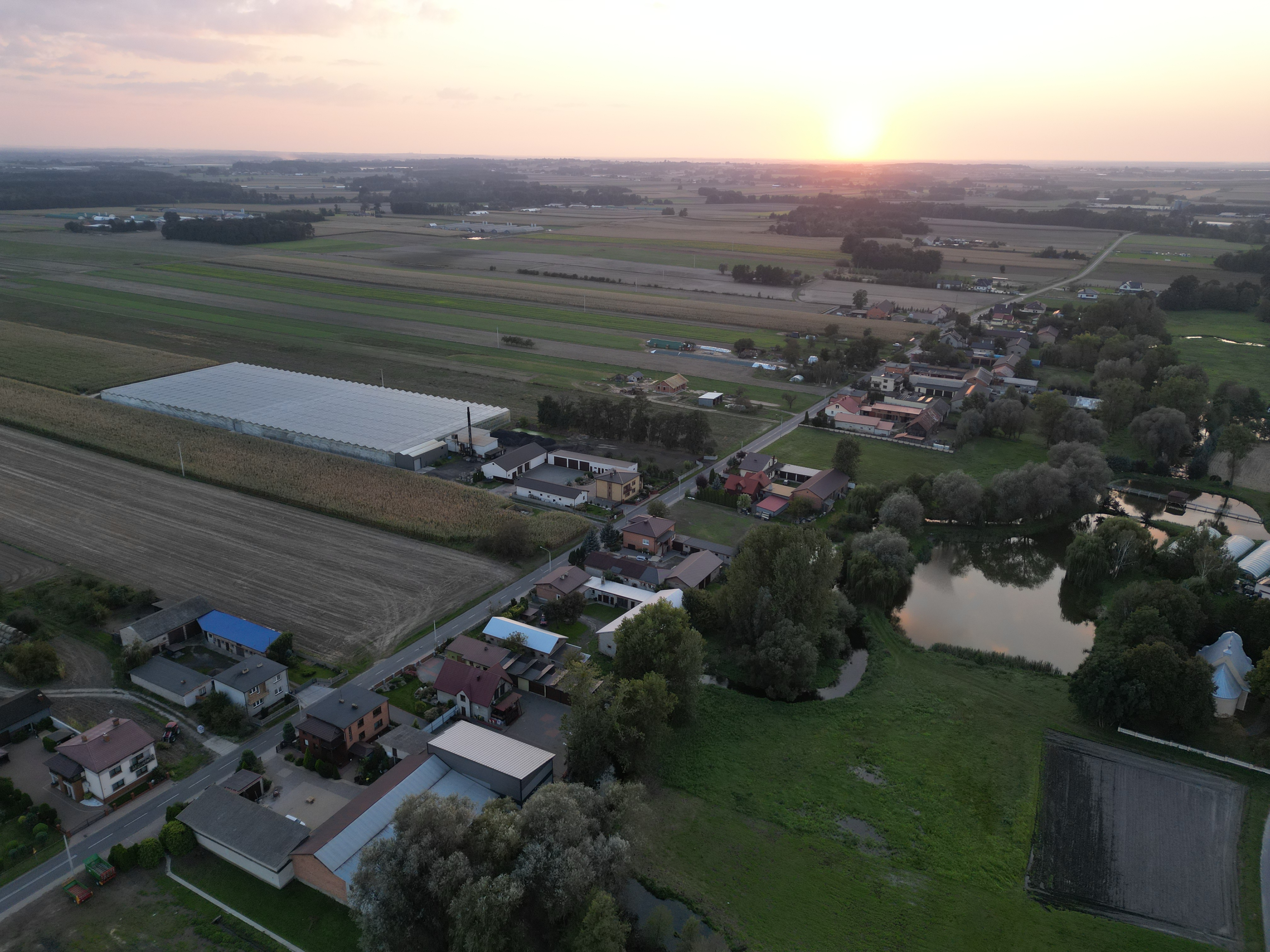
- Aerial view

- Location within Poland
- Coordinates: 51°46′15″N 18°24′03″E
- Country: Poland
- Voivodeship: Greater Poland
- County: Kalisz
- Gmina: Koźminek

Gać Kaliska (Polish pronunciation: [ˈɡat͡ɕ kaˈliska]) is a village in the administrative district of Gmina Koźminek, within Kalisz County, Greater Poland Voivodeship, in west-central Poland.
