= Bronisławów, Grodzisk County =

Bronisławów
- Village
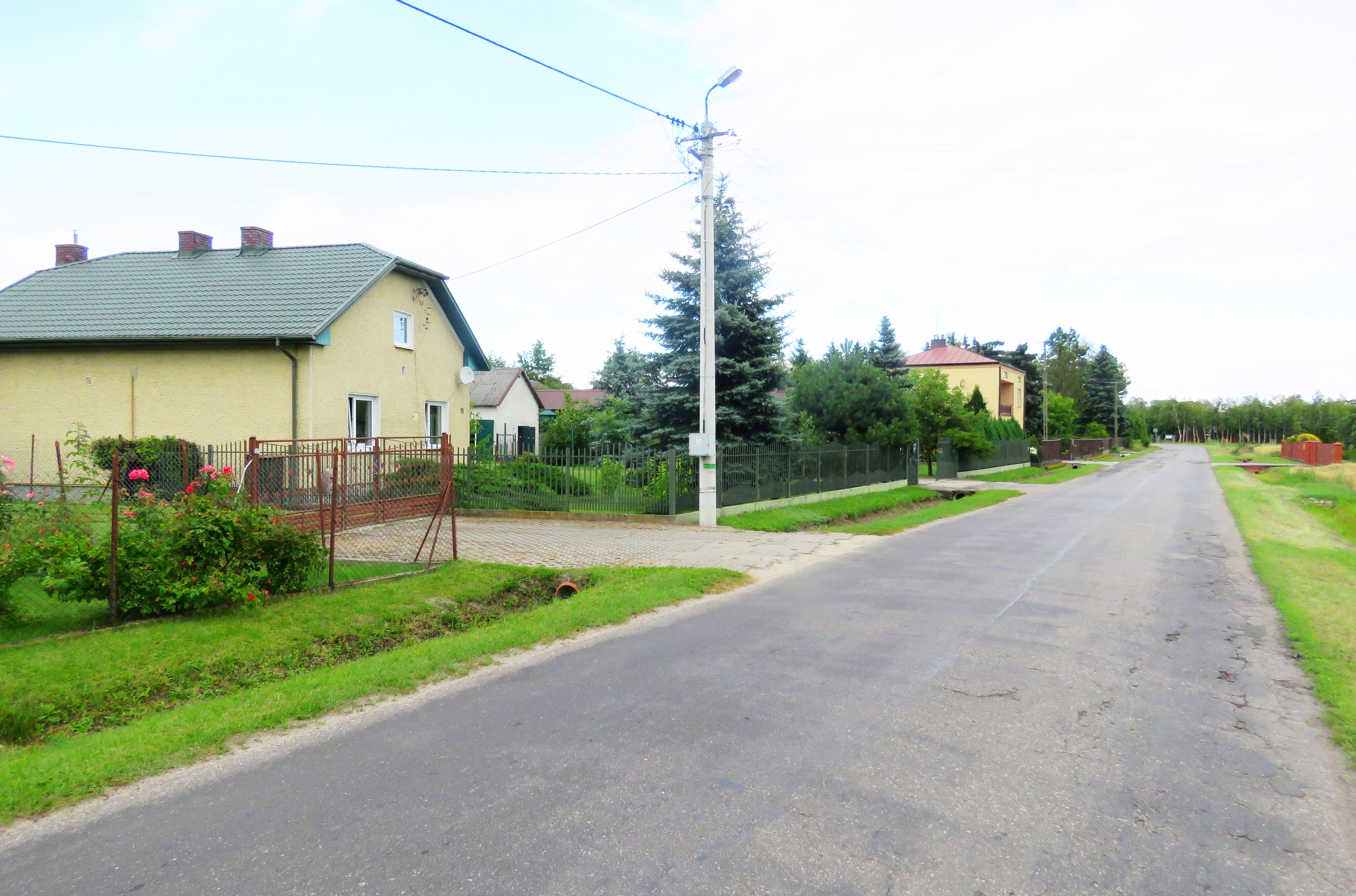

- Location within Poland
- Coordinates: 52°10′36″N 20°32′29″E
- Country: Poland
- Voivodeship: Masovian
- County: Grodzisk
- Gmina: Baranów

Bronisławów [brɔniˈswavuf] is a village in the administrative district of Gmina Baranów, within Grodzisk County, Masovian Voivodeship, in east-central Poland.
