= Kaski (surname) =

Kaski is a Finnish surname. Notable people with the surname include:

- Heino Kaski (1885–1957), Finnish composer, teacher, and pianist
- Oliwer Kaski (born 1995), Finnish ice hockey defenceman

== See also ==
- Kasky
