= Strumiany, Masovian Voivodeship =

Strumiany
- Village
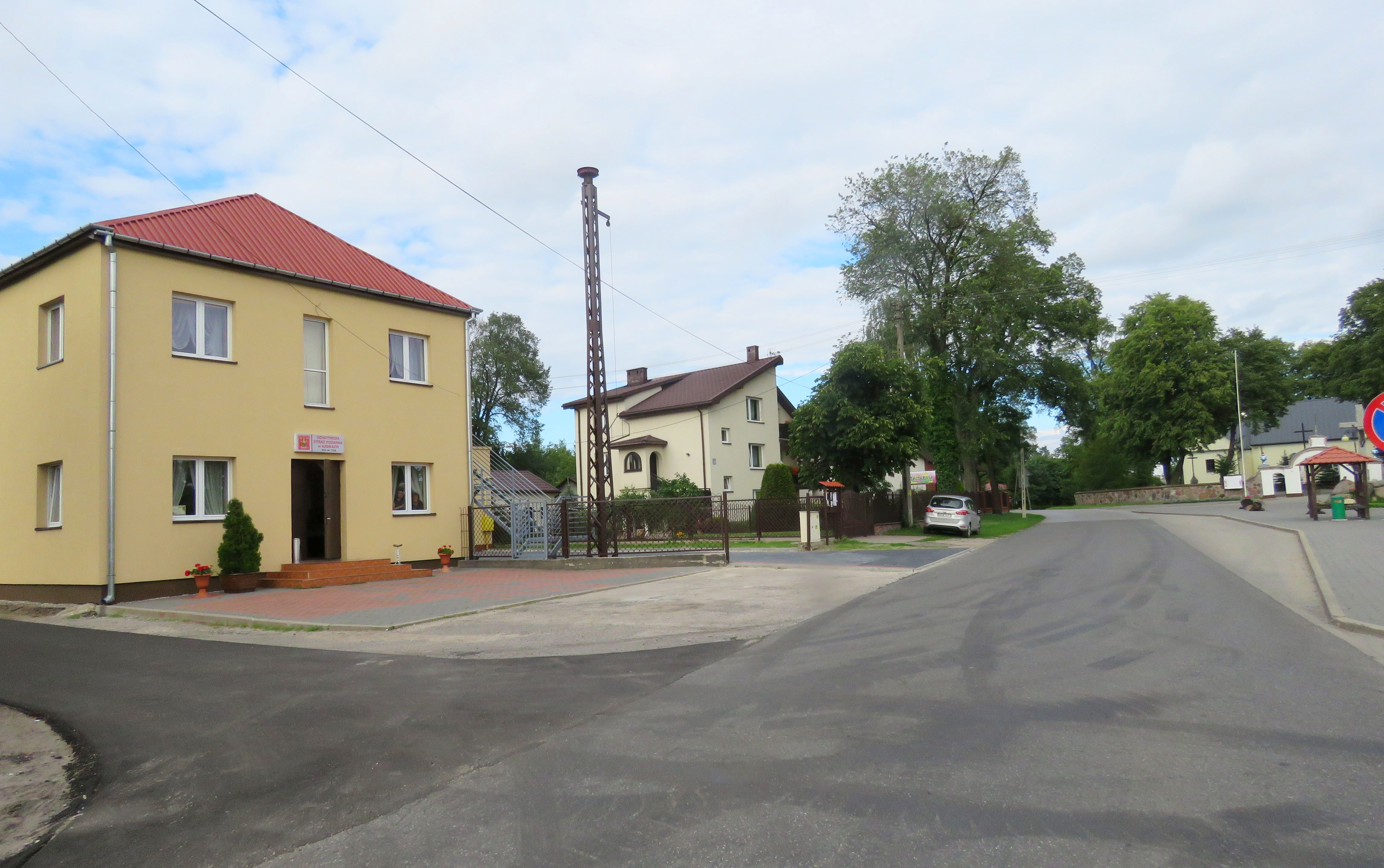

- Location within Poland
- Coordinates: 52°10′N 20°25′E
- Country: Poland
- Voivodeship: Masovian
- County: Grodzisk
- Gmina: Baranów

Strumiany [struˈmjanɨ] is a village in the administrative district of Gmina Baranów, within Grodzisk County, Masovian Voivodeship, in east-central Poland.
