= Słowiki, Kalisz County =

Słowiki
- Village
- Location within Poland
- Coordinates: 51°47′5″N 18°18′57″E
- Country: Poland
- Voivodeship: Greater Poland
- County: Kalisz
- Gmina: Koźminek
- Population: 120

Słowiki [swɔˈviki] is a village in the administrative district of Gmina Koźminek, within Kalisz County, Greater Poland Voivodeship, in west-central Poland.
