= Stara Pułapina =

- Village
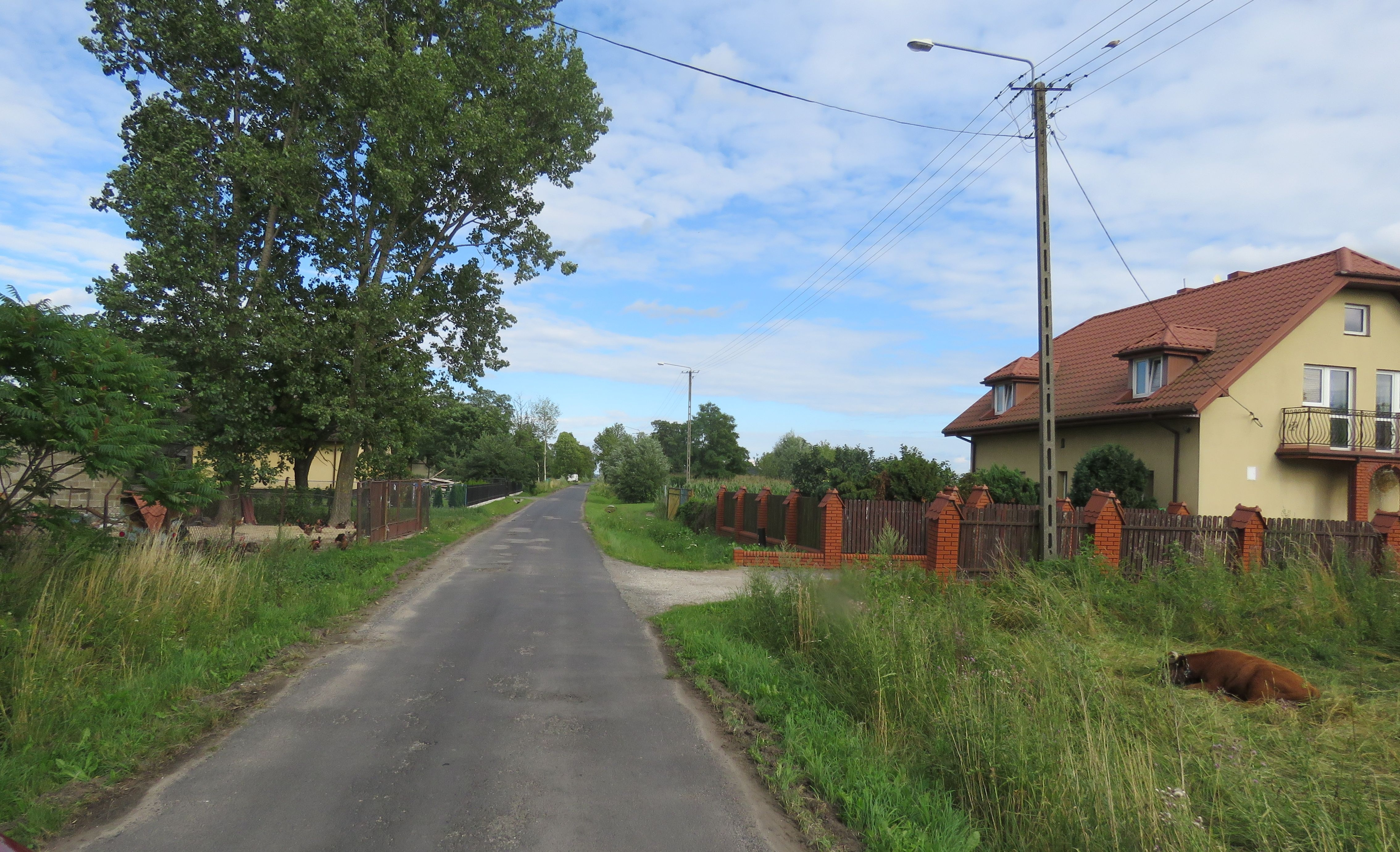

- Location within Poland
- Coordinates: 52°09′19″N 20°27′15″E
- Country: Poland
- Voivodeship: Masovian
- County: Grodzisk
- Gmina: Baranów

Stara Pułapina [ˈstara puwaˈpina] is a village in the administrative district of Gmina Baranów, within Grodzisk County, Masovian Voivodeship, in east-central Poland.
