= Kasky =

Kasky is the surname of the following people:

- Cameron Kasky (born 2000), is an American activist and advocate against gun violence
- Marc Kasky (born 1944), American consumer activist

== See also ==
- Kaski (disambiguation)
- Käsky (Tears of April), a 2008 Finnish war drama film
