= Gongolina =

- Village
- Location within Poland
- Coordinates: 52°10′28″N 20°27′02″E
- Country: Poland
- Voivodeship: Masovian
- County: Grodzisk
- Gmina: Baranów

Gongolina [ɡɔnɡɔˈlina] is a village in the administrative district of Gmina Baranów, within Grodzisk County, Masovian Voivodeship, in east-central Poland.
