= Nowa Pułapina =

- Village
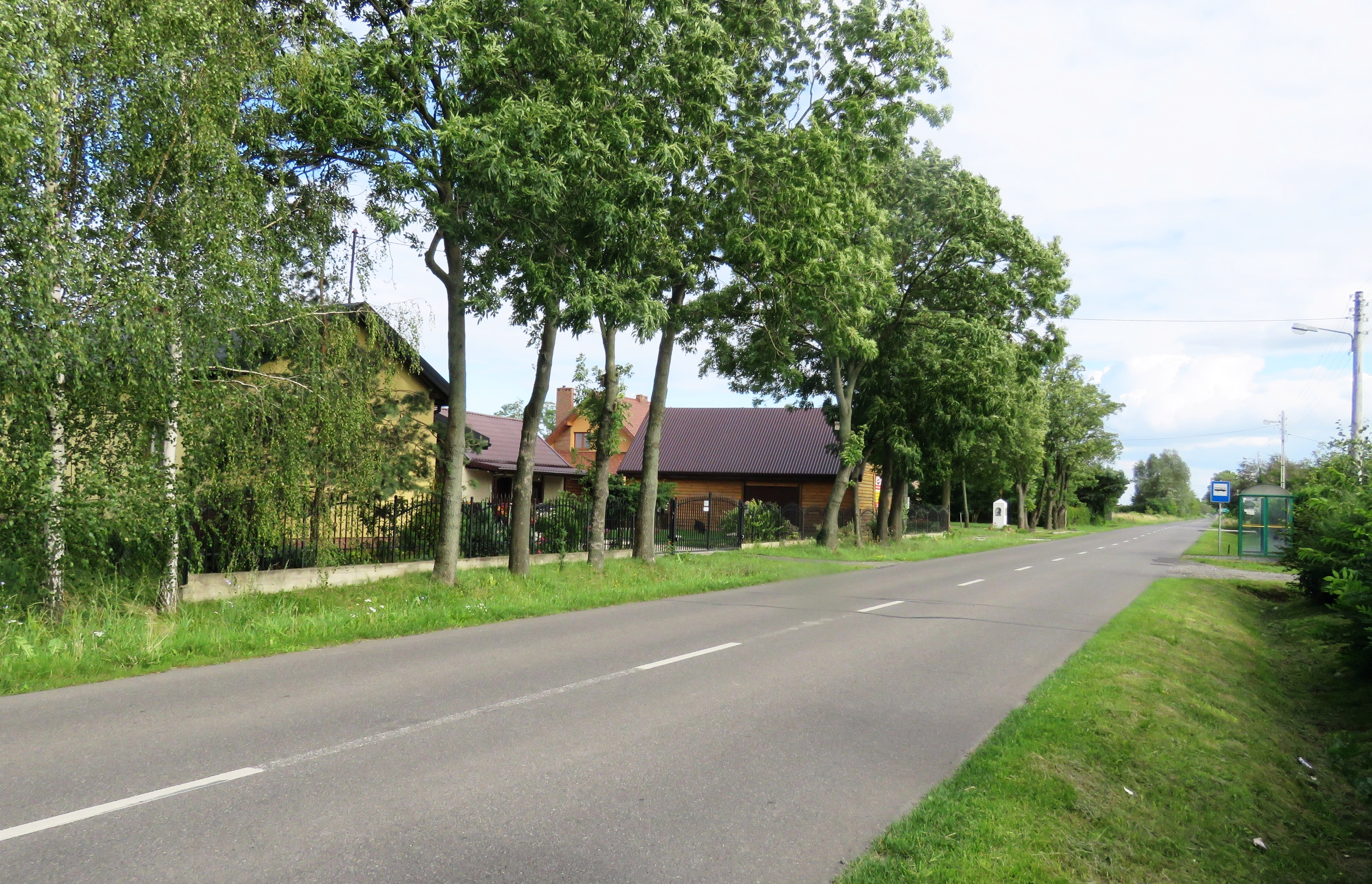

- Location within Poland
- Coordinates: 52°08′48″N 20°27′36″E
- Country: Poland
- Voivodeship: Masovian
- County: Grodzisk
- Gmina: Baranów

Nowa Pułapina [ˈnɔva puwaˈpina] is a village in the administrative district of Gmina Baranów, within Grodzisk County, Masovian Voivodeship, in east-central Poland.
