= Gmina Koźminek =

Gmina Koźminek Koźminek Commune
- Gmina
- Coat of arms

- Coordinates (Koźminek): 51°47′N 18°19′E
- Country: Poland
- Voivodeship: Greater Poland
- County: Kalisz County
- Seat: Koźminek

Area
  - Total: 88.43 km^{2} (34.14 sq mi)

Population (2006)
  - Total: 7,514
  - Density: 84.97/km^{2} (220.1/sq mi)
- Website: http://www.kozminek.pl

Gmina Koźminek is an urban-rural gmina (administrative district) in Kalisz County, Greater Poland Voivodeship, in west-central Poland. Its seat is the town of Koźminek, which lies approximately 17 kilometres (11 mi) east of Kalisz and 118 km (73 mi) south-east of the regional capital Poznań.

The gmina covers an area of 88.43 square kilometres (34.1 sq mi), and as of 2006 its total population is 7,514.

== Villages ==
Gmina Koźminek contains the villages and settlements of Agnieszków, Bogdanów, Chodybki, Dąbrowa, Dębsko, Dębsko-Dosinek, Dębsko-Ośrodek, Dębsko-Ostoja, Emilianów, Emilianów-Pośrednik, Emilianów-Zosina, Gać Kaliska, Gać Pawęzowa, Józefina, Krzyżówki, Ksawerów, Marianów, Młynisko, Moskurnia, Murowaniec, Nowy Karolew, Nowy Nakwasin, Osuchów, Osuchów-Parcela, Oszczeklin, Pietrzyków, Przydziałki, Raszawy, Rogal, Słowiki, Smółki, Sokołówka, Stary Karolew, Stary Nakwasin, Tymianek and Złotniki.

== Towns ==
Koźminek

== Neighbouring gminas ==
Gmina Koźminek is bordered by the gminas of Ceków-Kolonia, Goszczanów, Lisków, Opatówek and Szczytniki.
