= Sokołówka, Kalisz County =

Sokołówka
- Village
- Location within Poland
- Coordinates: 51°49′20″N 18°18′11″E
- Country: Poland
- Voivodeship: Greater Poland
- County: Kalisz
- Gmina: Koźminek

Sokołówka [sɔkɔˈwufka] is a village in the administrative district of Gmina Koźminek, within Kalisz County, Greater Poland Voivodeship, in west-central Poland.
