= Emilianów-Pośrednik =

- Village
- Location within Poland
- Coordinates: 51°48′57″N 18°19′06″E
- Country: Poland
- Voivodeship: Greater Poland
- County: Kalisz
- Gmina: Koźminek

Emilianów-Pośrednik [ɛmiˈljanuf pɔˈɕrɛdnik] is a village in the administrative district of Gmina Koźminek, within Kalisz County, Greater Poland Voivodeship, in west-central Poland.
