= Osuchów-Parcela =

- Village
- Location within Poland
- Coordinates: 51°48′22″N 18°18′26″E
- Country: Poland
- Voivodeship: Greater Poland
- County: Kalisz
- Gmina: Koźminek

Osuchów-Parcela [ɔˈsuxuf parˈt͡sɛla] is a village in the administrative district of Gmina Koźminek, within Kalisz County, Greater Poland Voivodeship, in west-central Poland.
