= Żaby, Masovian Voivodeship =

Żaby
- Village
- Location within Poland
- Coordinates: 52°11′N 20°30′E
- Country: Poland
- Voivodeship: Masovian
- County: Grodzisk
- Gmina: Baranów

Żaby [ˈʐabɨ] is a village in the administrative district of Gmina Baranów, within Grodzisk County, Masovian Voivodeship, in east-central Poland.
