= Emilianów-Zosina =

- Village
- Location within Poland
- Coordinates: 51°48′58″N 18°19′50″E
- Country: Poland
- Voivodeship: Greater Poland
- County: Kalisz
- Gmina: Koźminek
- Time zone: UTC+1 (CET)
  - Summer (DST): UTC+2 (CEST)

Emilianów-Zosina [ɛmiˈljanuf zɔˈɕina] is a village in the administrative district of Gmina Koźminek, within Kalisz County, Greater Poland Voivodeship, in west-central Poland.

During the years from 1975 through 1998, the hamlet was administratively a part of the Kalisz Voivodeship.
