= Krzyżówki, Greater Poland Voivodeship =

Krzyżówki
- Village
- Location within Poland
- Coordinates: 51°50′N 18°17′E
- Country: Poland
- Voivodeship: Greater Poland
- County: Kalisz
- Gmina: Koźminek

Krzyżówki [kʂɨˈʐufki] is a village in the administrative district of Gmina Koźminek, within Kalisz County, Greater Poland Voivodeship, in west-central Poland.
