= Marianów, Kalisz County =

Marianów
- Village
- Location within Poland
- Coordinates: 51°45′41″N 18°22′05″E
- Country: Poland
- Voivodeship: Greater Poland
- County: Kalisz
- Gmina: Koźminek
- Time zone: UTC+1 (CET)
  - Summer (DST): UTC+2 (CEST)
- Vehicle registration: PKA

Marianów [maˈrjanuf] is a village in the administrative district of Gmina Koźminek, within Kalisz County, Greater Poland Voivodeship, in central Poland.
