= Stanisławów, Grodzisk County =

Stanisławów
- Village
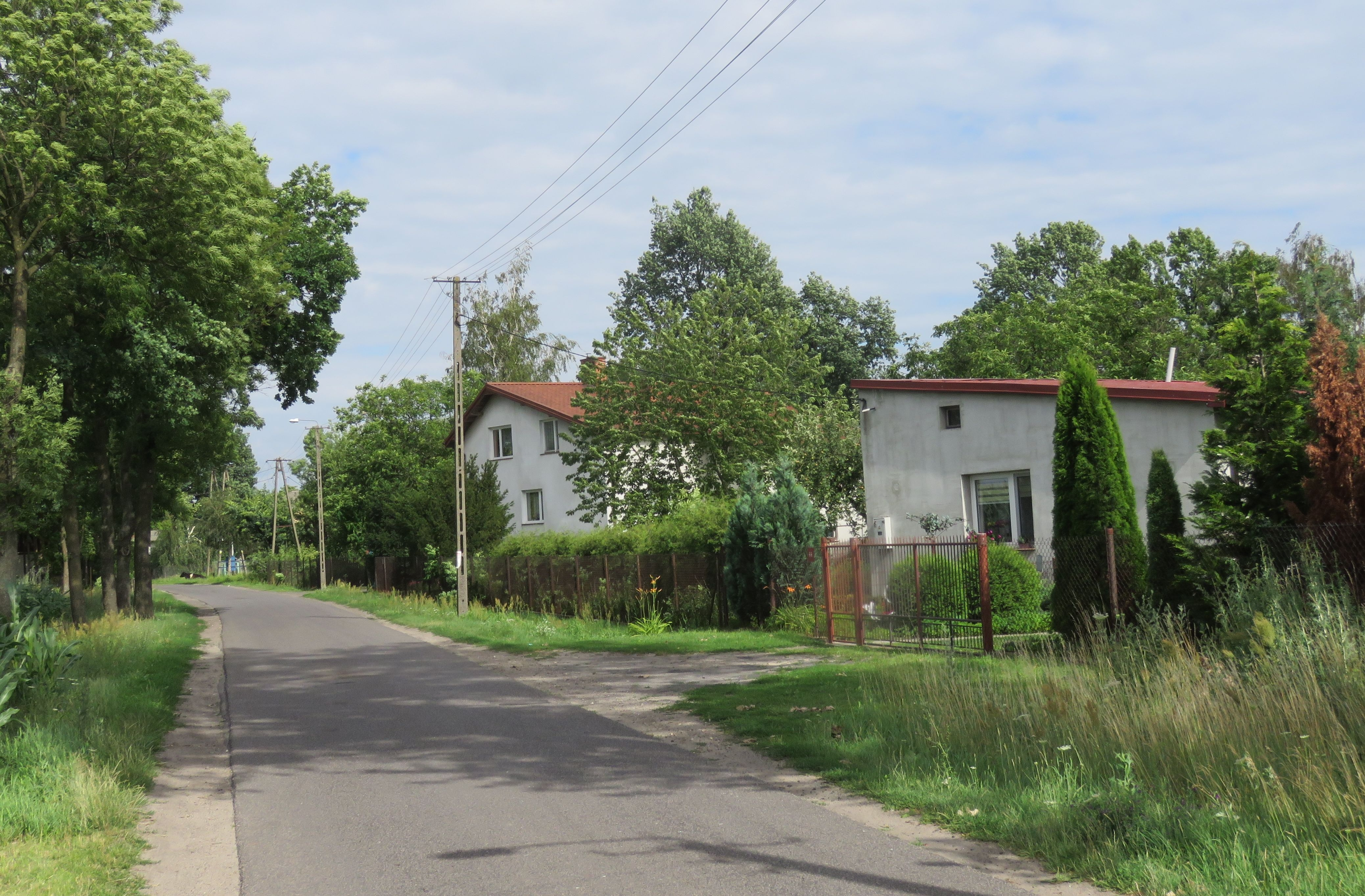

- Location within Poland
- Coordinates: 52°8′N 20°29′E
- Country: Poland
- Voivodeship: Masovian
- County: Grodzisk
- Gmina: Baranów
- Time zone: UTC+1 (CET)
  - Summer (DST): UTC+2 (CEST)
- Vehicle registration: WGM

Stanisławów [staniˈswavuf] is a village in the administrative district of Gmina Baranów, within Grodzisk County, Masovian Voivodeship, in east-central Poland.

== History ==
Seven Polish citizens were murdered by Nazi Germany in the village during World War II.
