= Kaski, Masovian Voivodeship =

Kaski
- Village
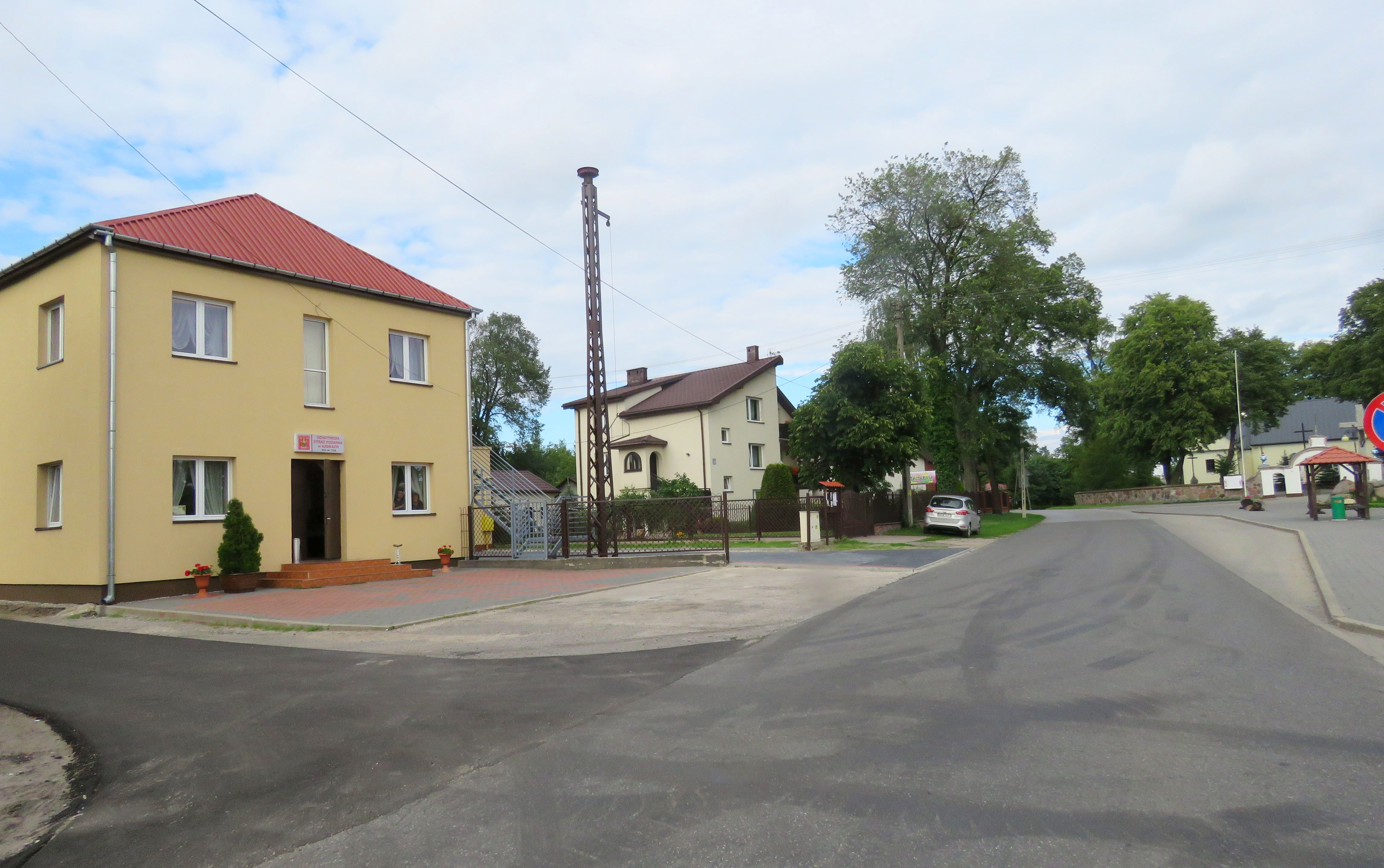

- Location within Poland
- Coordinates: 52°11′N 20°26′E
- Country: Poland
- Voivodeship: Masovian
- County: Grodzisk
- Gmina: Baranów
- Population: 807
- Website: http://www.kaski.strona.pl/

Kaski [ˈkaski] is a village in the administrative district of Gmina Baranów, within Grodzisk County, Masovian Voivodeship, in east-central Poland.
