= Buszyce, Masovian Voivodeship =

Buszyce
- Village
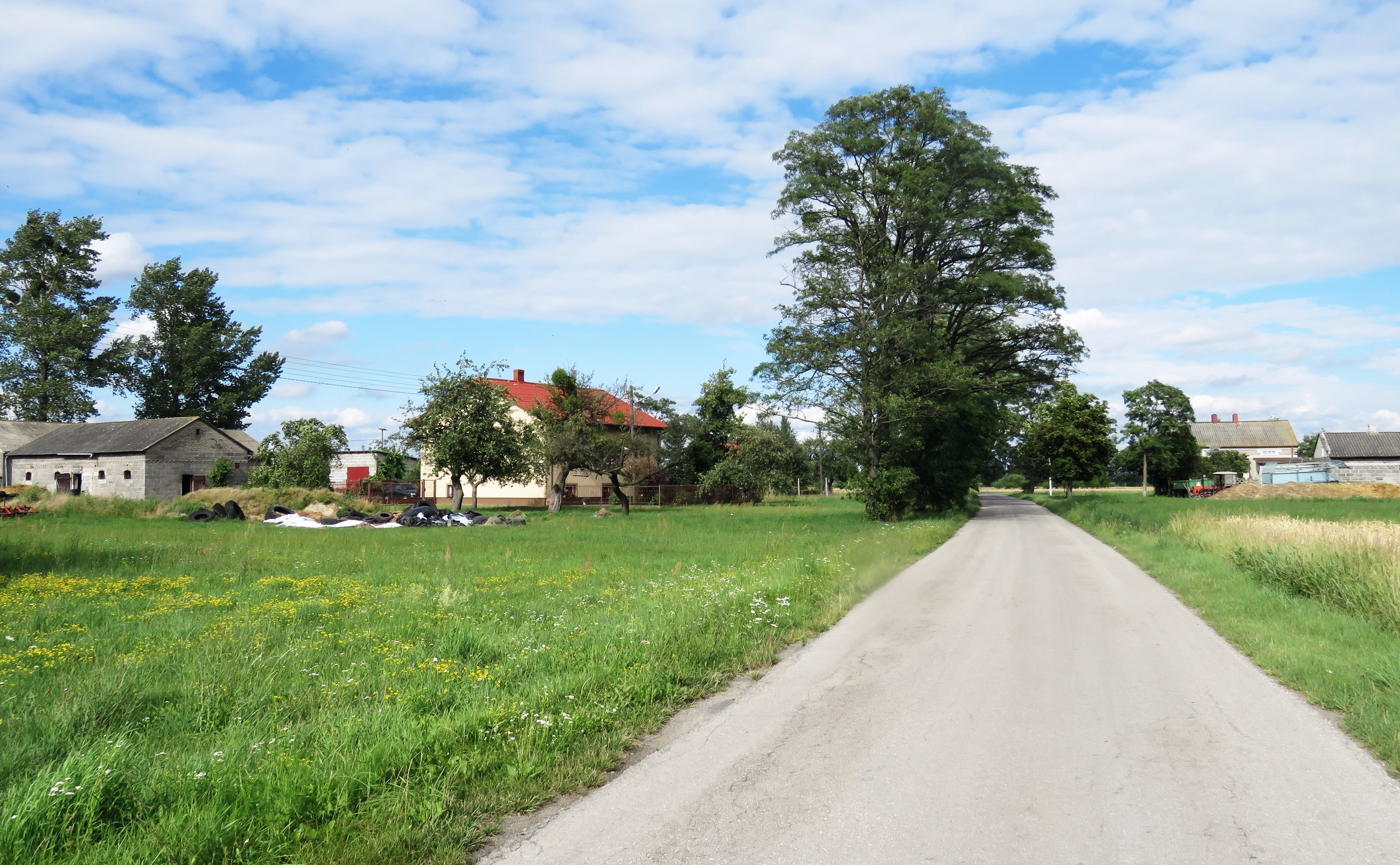

- Location within Poland
- Coordinates: 52°8′N 20°26′E
- Country: Poland
- Voivodeship: Masovian
- County: Grodzisk
- Gmina: Baranów

Buszyce [buˈʂɨt͡sɛ] is a village in the administrative district of Gmina Baranów, within Grodzisk County, Masovian Voivodeship, in east-central Poland.
