= Baranów, Grodzisk County =

Baranów
- Village
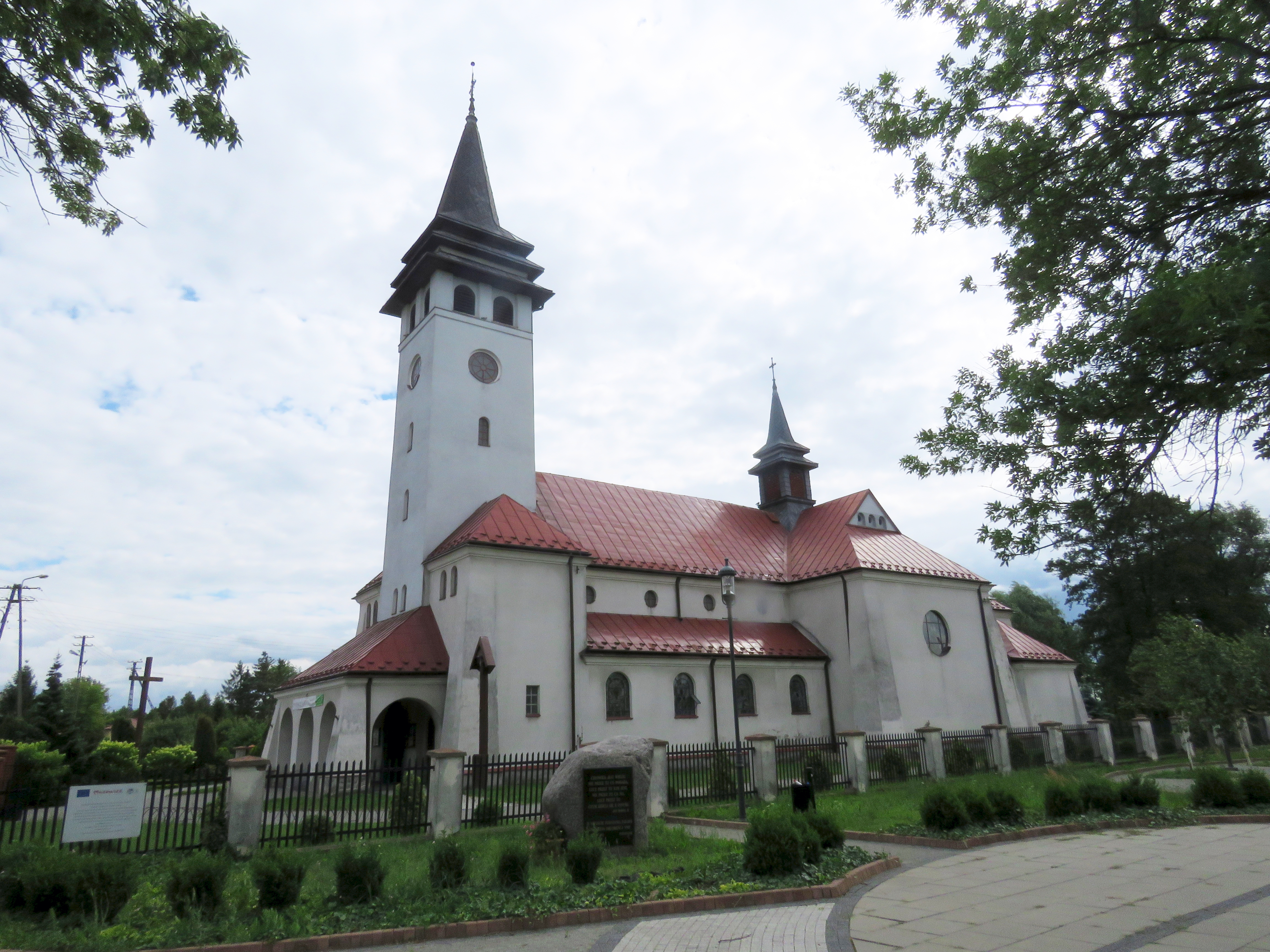
- Church of Saint Joseph

- Location within Poland
- Coordinates: 52°07′00″N 20°29′00″E
- Country: Poland
- Voivodeship: Masovian
- County: Grodzisk
- Gmina: Baranów

Baranów [baˈranuf] is a village in Grodzisk County, Masovian Voivodeship, in east-central Poland. It is the seat of the gmina (administrative district) called Gmina Baranów.
