= Murowaniec, Gmina Koźminek =

Murowaniec
- Village
- Location within Poland
- Coordinates: 51°48′51″N 18°16′47″E
- Country: Poland
- Voivodeship: Greater Poland
- County: Kalisz
- Gmina: Koźminek

Murowaniec [murɔˈvaɲɛt͡s] is a village in the administrative district of Gmina Koźminek, within Kalisz County, Greater Poland Voivodeship, in west-central Poland.
