= Marc Kasky =

American consumer activist

Marc Kasky in 2022

Marc Kasky (born 1944) is a consumer activist best known for bringing a lawsuit against Nike Inc. in 1998 under a California law against false advertising and unfair competition for their advertising claims about treatment of Chinese, Indonesian and Vietnamese workers at company subcontractors.

== Career ==
Kasky was born in Stamford, Connecticut and graduated from Wesleyan University and Yale University. He moved to San Francisco in the 1970s and headed the San Francisco Ecology Center, and later the Fort Mason Center. Kasky currently serves as a co-director at the Green Century Institute.

Kasky is a former amateur and semi-professional baseball player, who retired from baseball in 1997. He is also an active wilderness backpacker, with extensive experience in the back country of the High Sierra.

=== Kasky v. Nike, Inc. ===
Kasky filed a lawsuit in California regarding newspaper advertisements and several letters Nike distributed in response to criticisms of labor conditions in its factories. Kasky claimed that the company made representations that constituted false advertising. Nike responded that the false advertising laws did not cover the company's expression of its views on a public issue, and that these were entitled to First Amendment protection. The local court agreed with Nike's lawyers, but the California Supreme Court overturned this ruling, claiming that the corporation's communications were commercial speech and therefore subject to false advertising laws.

The United States Supreme Court agreed to review the case (Nike v. Kasky) but sent the case back to trial court without issuing a substantive ruling on the constitutional issues. The parties subsequently settled out of court before any finding on the accuracy of Nike's statements, leaving the California Supreme Court's denial of Nike's immunity claim as precedent. The case drew a great deal of attention from groups concerned with civil liberties, as well as anti-sweatshop activists.
