= Murowaniec, Masovian Voivodeship =

Murowaniec
- Village
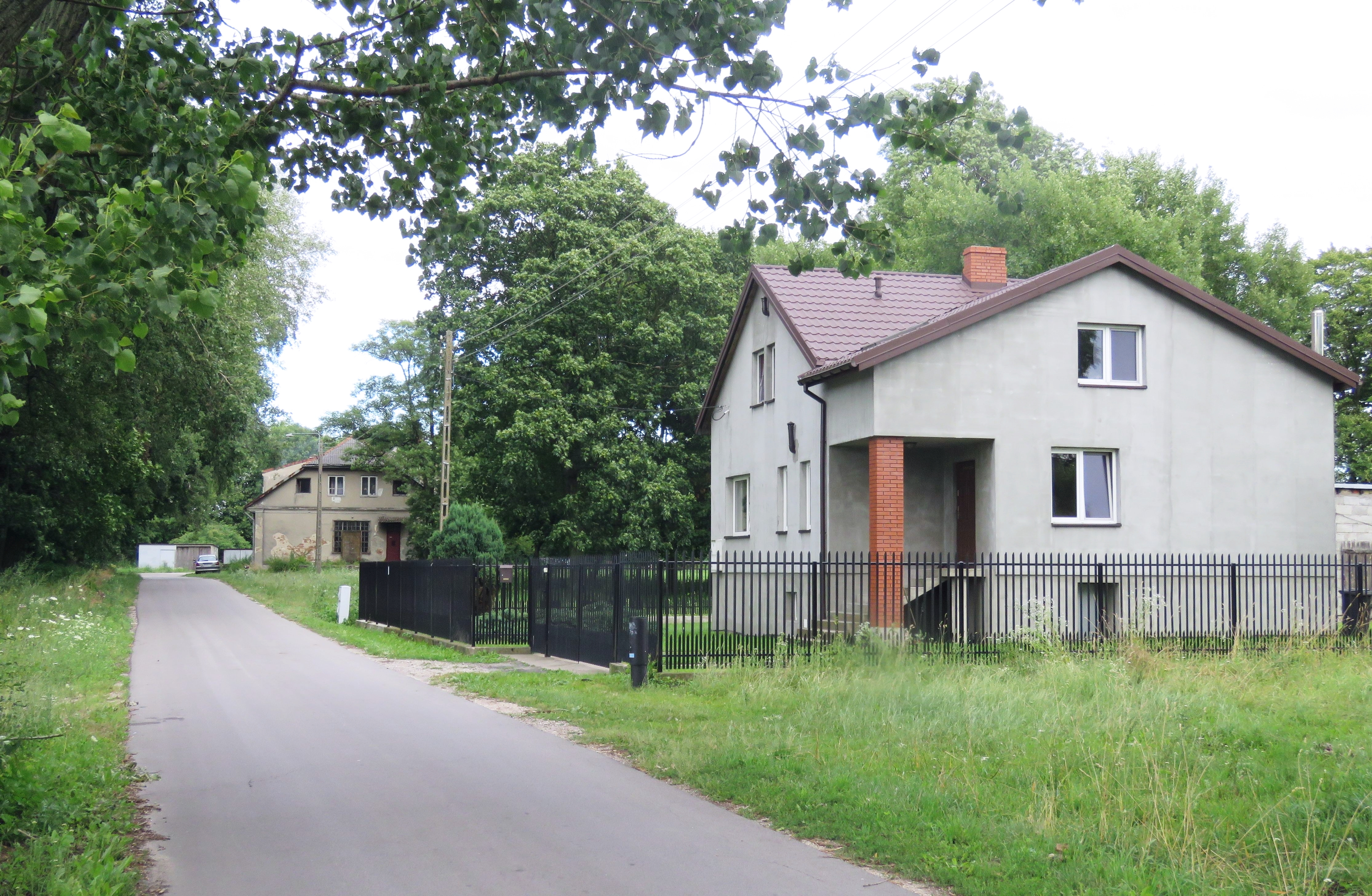

- Location within Poland
- Coordinates: 52°09′45″N 20°30′24″E
- Country: Poland
- Voivodeship: Masovian
- County: Grodzisk
- Gmina: Baranów

Murowaniec [murɔˈvaɲɛt͡s] is a village in the administrative district of Gmina Baranów, within Grodzisk County, Masovian Voivodeship, in east-central Poland.
