= Pascall+Watson =

Architectural firm

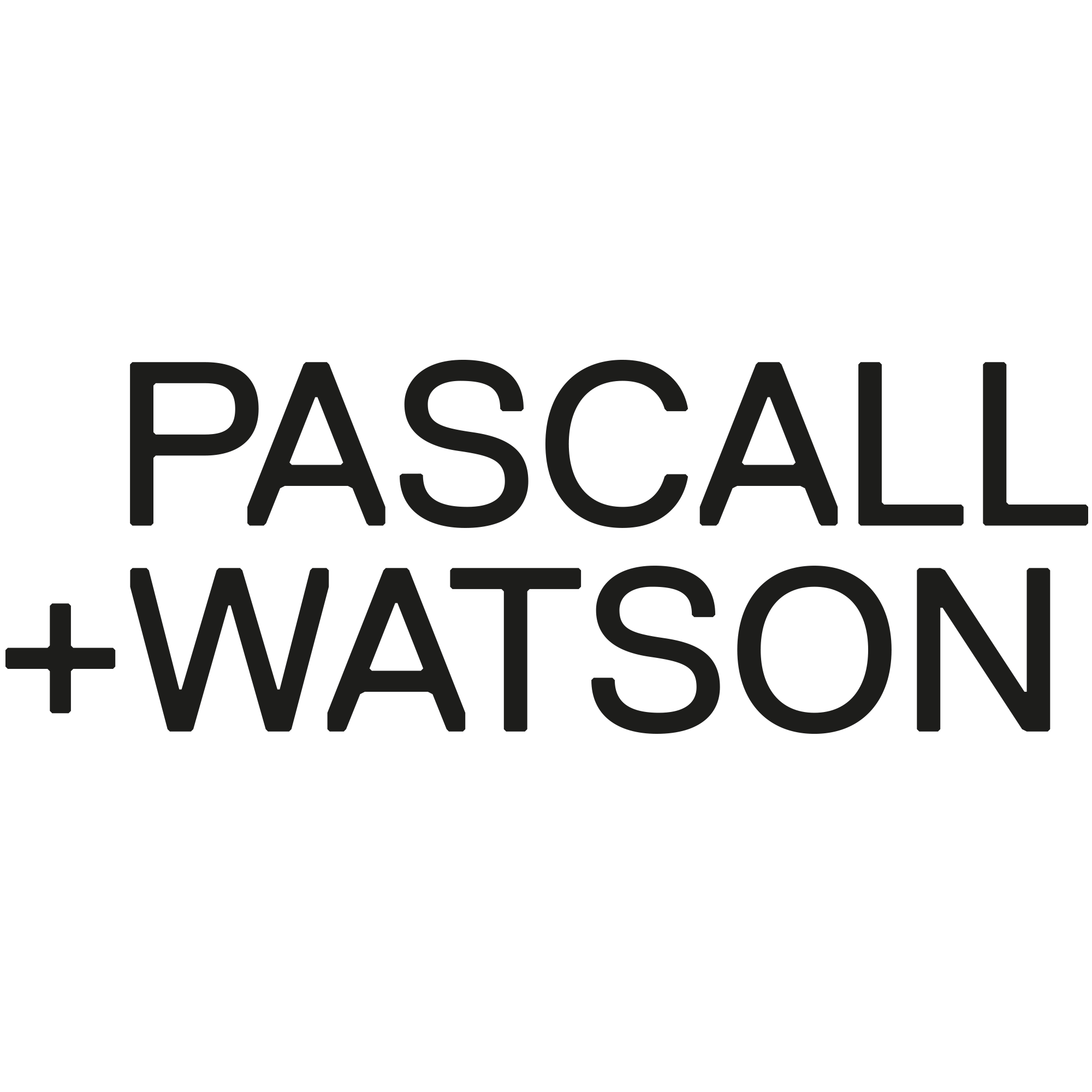
- Industry: Architecture
- Founded: London, United Kingdom; 1956
- Number of locations: 4 Offices; London; Dublin; Limerick; Abu Dhabi
- Area served: Worldwide
- Services: Architecture, Masterplanning
- Website: Pascall+Watson

Pascall+Watson (formerly Pascall+Watson Architects) is an international architectural firm, founded in 1956 by Clive Pascall and Peter Watson. It became a limited company in 1983. Its main office is situated in Blackfriars, London on the site of the Apothecaries Hall, London on Black Friars Lane. The company was ranked 21st in size by the AJ100 in 2019.

It currently has offices in London, Dublin, Limerick and Abu Dhabi.

== Commissions and competitions ==
Pascall+Watson have been regarded as one of the largest aviation architectural practices in the world.

In 2013, Pascall+Watson were appointed to a team along with Zaha Hadid Architects and Atkins to advise the Mayor of London to help develop plans for a multi runway hub airport in the southeast of England.

The consortium of Pascall+Watson, Reynolds, Smith & Hills and Buro Happold was awarded a place on the Architectural and Engineering Framework for Abu Dhabi Airports Company and was selected for the design for the $3bn Midfield Terminal Complex landside support facilities.

In July 2014, Pascall+Watson was commissioned to take over from Bennetts Associates on stations in the western section of the £15 billion Crossrail scheme under a design and build contract. The practice will now deliver detailed design at 14 stations, including Ealing Broadway, as part of a team led by contractor Taylor Woodrow.

In July 2014, Pascall+Watson obtained planning permission for the £100 million redevelopment of Luton Airport. The scheme will include extending the terminal building, increasing retail, circulation and seating areas, while improving access. The redevelopment will see the airports capacity increase from 12 million to 18 million by 2031.

== Project list ==
=== Aviation ===
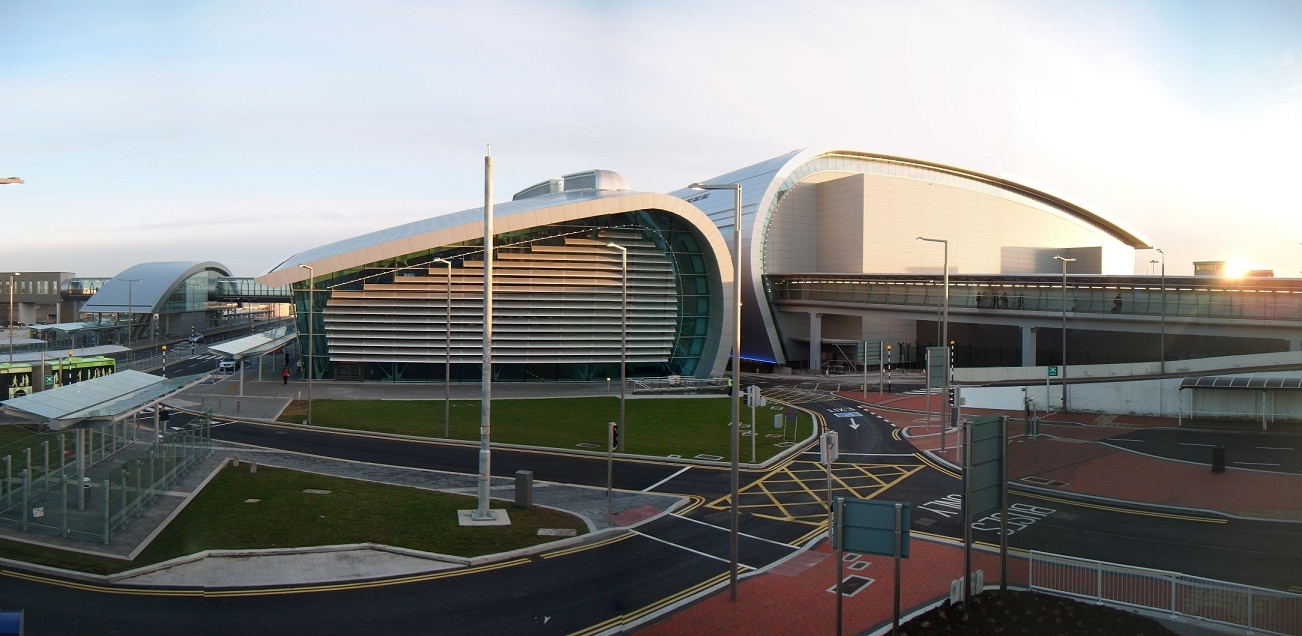
Terminal 2 Dublin Airport

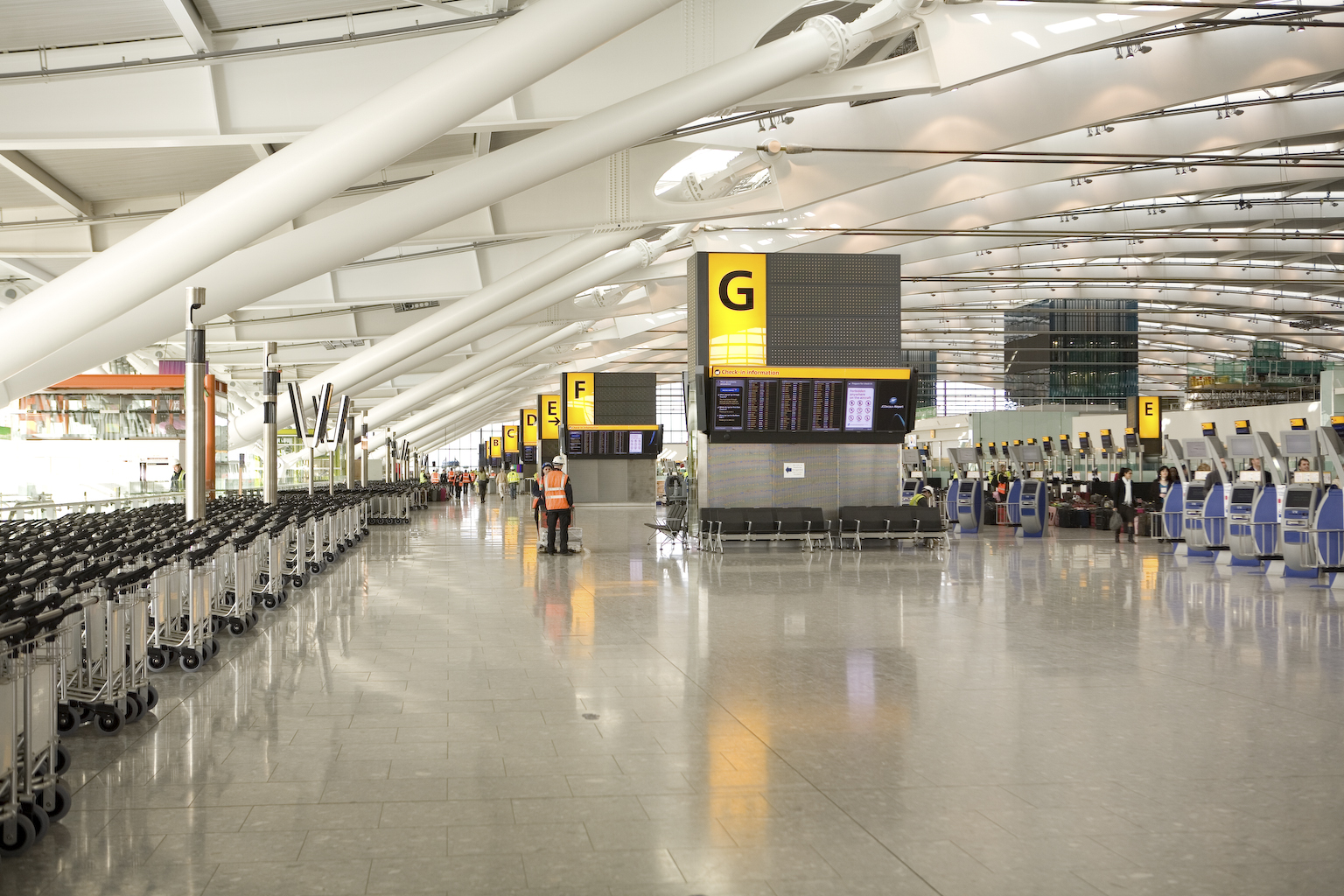
Terminal 5A landside concourse

Pascall+Watson have been involved in major projects worldwide as concept architects and executive architects.

- Jomo Kenyatta International Airport New Greenfield Terminal - Primary designers for terminal facilities
- Dublin Airport Terminal 2 was designed by Pascall+Watson and built by a consortium comprising Arup, Mace, and Davis Langdon PKS.
- Heathrow Terminal 5. Rogers Stirk Harbour + Partners were Concept Design Architect, with Pascall+Watson as Scheme & Production Design Architects.
- Heathrow Terminal 2 Luis Vidal + Architects were the concept and lead architects for the new terminal and have collaborated with Pascall+Watson during the fit out phase.
- Pulkovo Airport Engineering firm Ramboll were appointed lead design consultant in 2008. Grimshaw were concept guardians, while Pascal+Watson were appointed as executive architects.
- Varna Airport and Burgas Airport were designed by Halcrow and Pascall+Watson in partnership with SavantElbul of Bulgaria.
- Larnaca International Airport
- Chaudhary Charan Singh International Airport Terminal - 3 has been designed by Pascal+Watson in 2018.
- Tiruchirappalli International Airport
- Trivandrum International airport
- Paphos International Airport

=== Rail ===
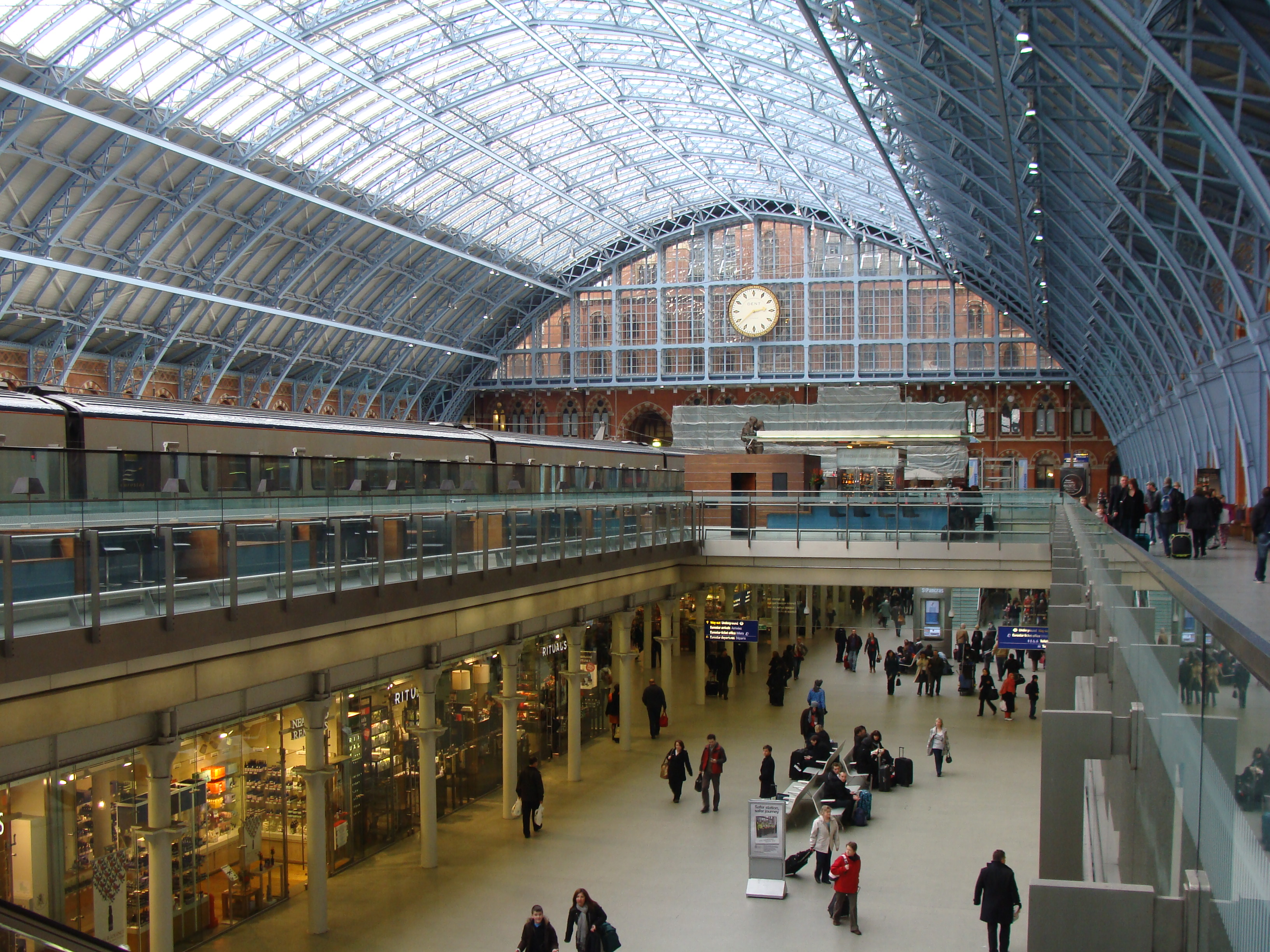
Interior of station, with Eurostar train awaiting departure at left (2010)

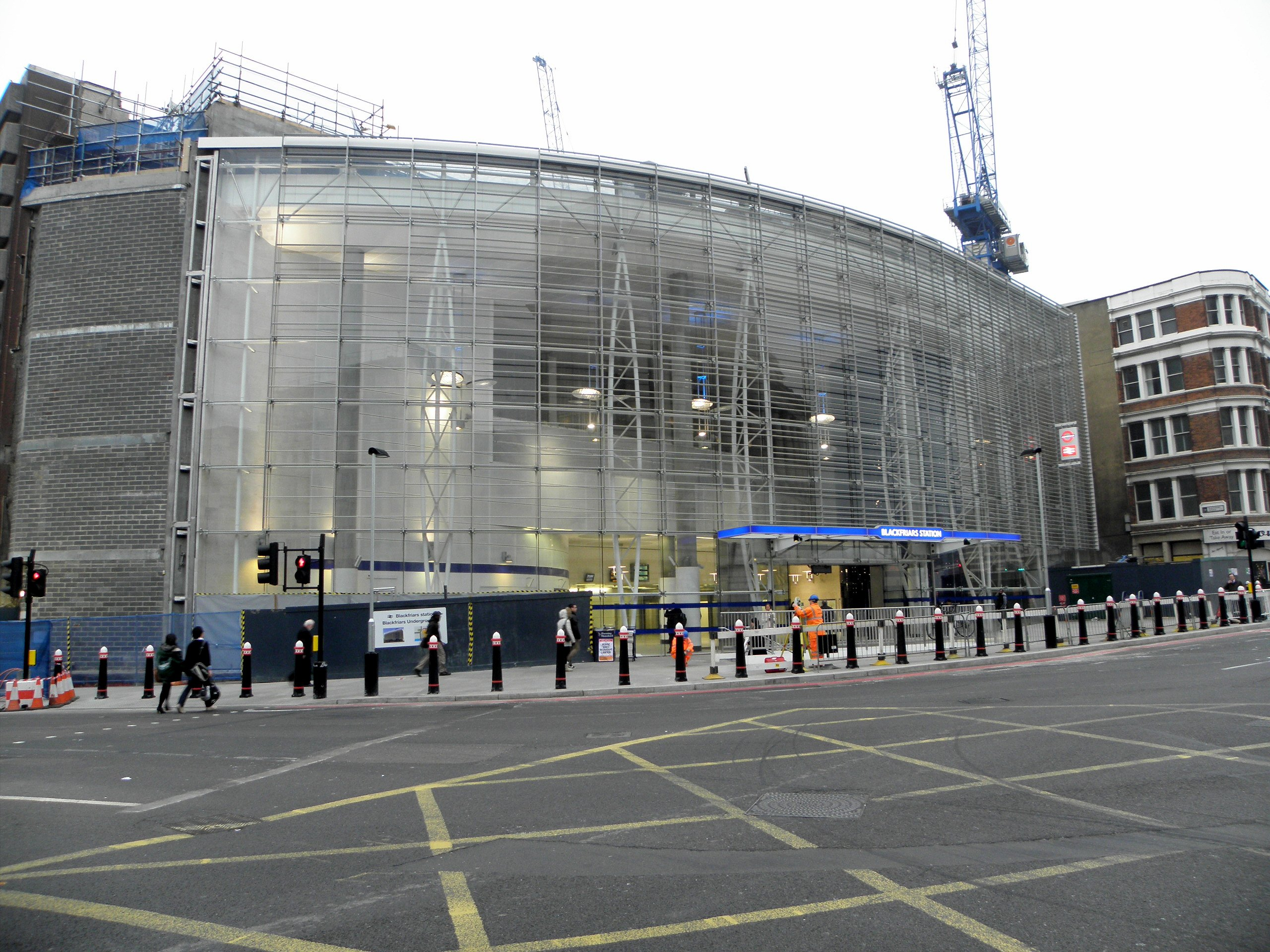
Blackfriars Station Entrance(2012)

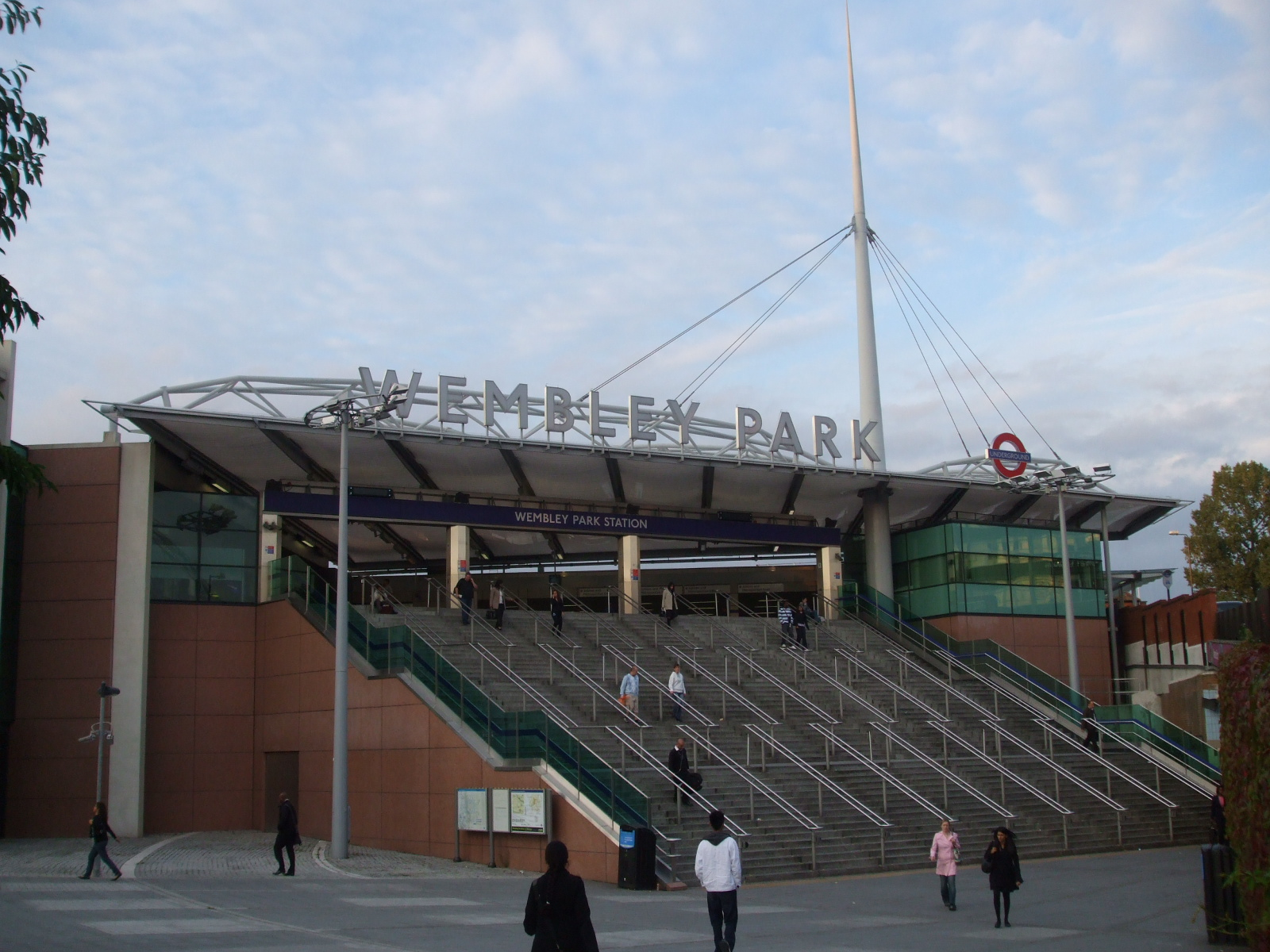
Wembley Park Station - Entrance to Olympic Way

- St Pancras railway station
- Blackfriars station, London (2012), designed by Pascall+Watson but executed by Jacobs Engineering Group, who were heavily criticised by Keiron Long of the Evening Standard.
- London Bridge station Concourse
- King's Cross station, London
- Nottingham station, Nottingham
- Wembley Park tube station, London
- South Quay DLR Station, London

== Awards ==
- Royal Institute of British Architects London Regional Awards 2014 - Winner - Blackfriars Station
- World Architecture Festival Awards 2013 - WAF Future Projects: Infrastructure - Shortlisted - Siem Reap Airport, Cambodia
- British Constructional Steelwork Association Structural Steel Design Awards 2010 - Winner - Dublin Airport Terminal 2

== See also ==
- List of architecture firms
- List of architects
