= Cegłów, Grodzisk County =

Cegłów
- Village
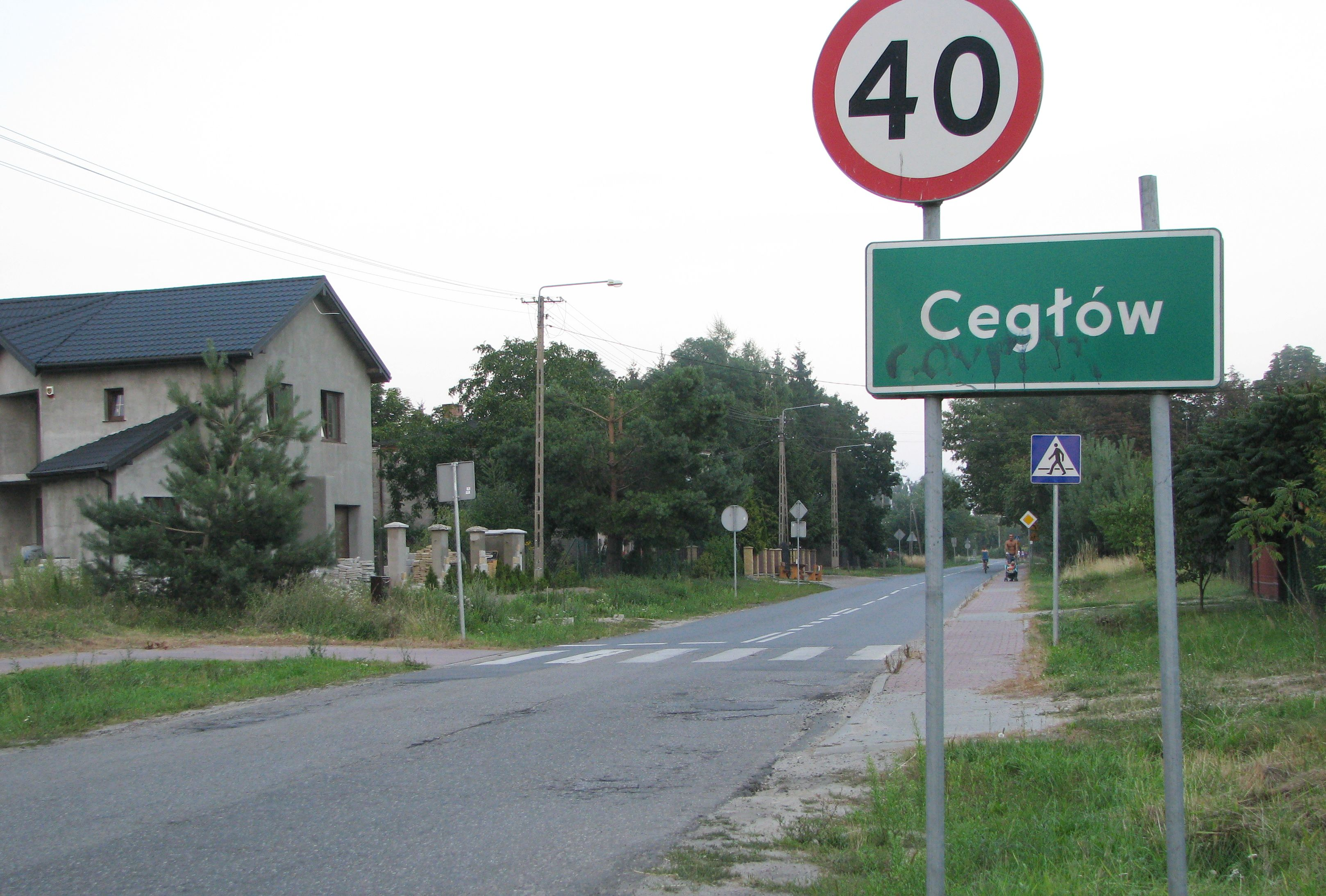

- Location within Poland
- Coordinates: 52°9′44″N 20°31′17″E
- Country: Poland
- Voivodeship: Masovian
- County: Grodzisk
- Gmina: Baranów
- Elevation: 96 m (315 ft)
- Population: 192

Cegłów [ˈt͡sɛɡwuf] is a village in the administrative district of Gmina Baranów, within Grodzisk County, Masovian Voivodeship, in east-central Poland.
