= Rogale =

Rogale may refer to:

- Rogale, Lublin Voivodeship (east Poland)
- Rogale, Masovian Voivodeship (east-central Poland)
- Rogale, Podlaskie Voivodeship (north-east Poland)
- Rogale, Ełk County in Warmian-Masurian Voivodeship (north Poland)
- Rogale, Gołdap County in Warmian-Masurian Voivodeship (north Poland)
- Rogale, Szczytno County in Warmian-Masurian Voivodeship (north Poland)

== See also ==
- Rogal (disambiguation)
