= Rogal, Greater Poland Voivodeship =

Rogal
- Village
- Location within Poland
- Coordinates: 51°47′42″N 18°16′39″E
- Country: Poland
- Voivodeship: Greater Poland
- County: Kalisz
- Gmina: Koźminek

Rogal [ˈrɔɡal] is a village in the administrative district of Gmina Koźminek, within Kalisz County, Greater Poland Voivodeship, in west-central Poland.
