= Żabia Wola =

Żabia Wola (will of the frog) may refer to the following places:

- Żabia Wola, Gmina Głusk in Lublin Voivodeship (east Poland)
- Żabia Wola, Gmina Strzyżewice in Lublin Voivodeship (east Poland)
- Żabia Wola, Białobrzegi County in Masovian Voivodeship (east-central Poland)
- Żabia Wola, Gmina Żabia Wola, Grodzisk County in Masovian Voivodeship (east-central Poland)
- Gmina Żabia Wola
