= Bolesławek =

- Village
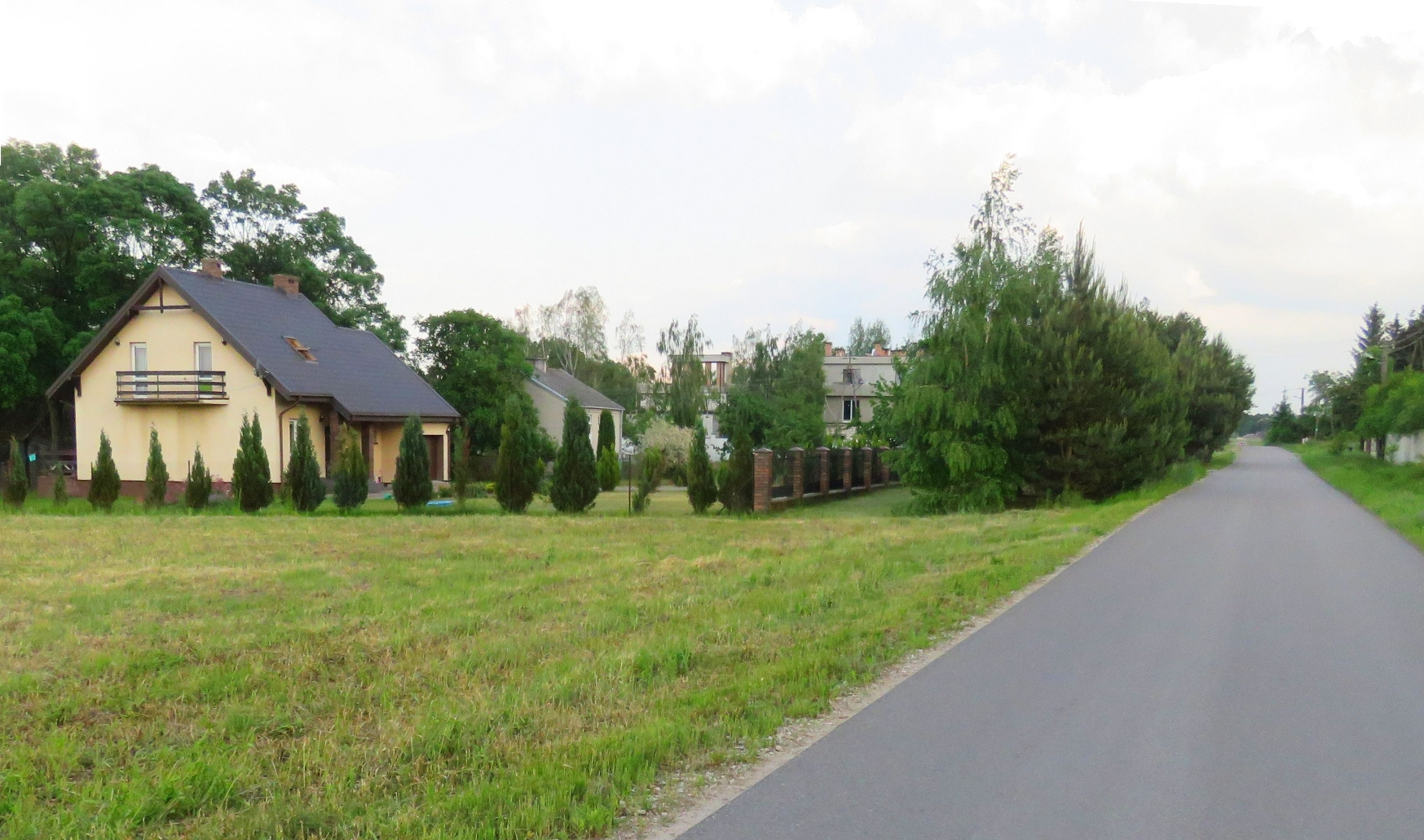

- Location within Poland
- Coordinates: 51°59′49″N 20°38′55″E
- Country: Poland
- Voivodeship: Masovian
- County: Grodzisk
- Gmina: Żabia Wola

Bolesławek [bɔlɛˈswavɛk] is a village in the administrative district of Gmina Żabia Wola, within Grodzisk County, Masovian Voivodeship, in east-central Poland. During World War II, it was extensively bombed by the German Luftwaffe, then torched in reprisal for resistance activity. Most of the inhabitants were killed or deported.
