= Lasek, Gmina Żabia Wola =

Lasek
- Village
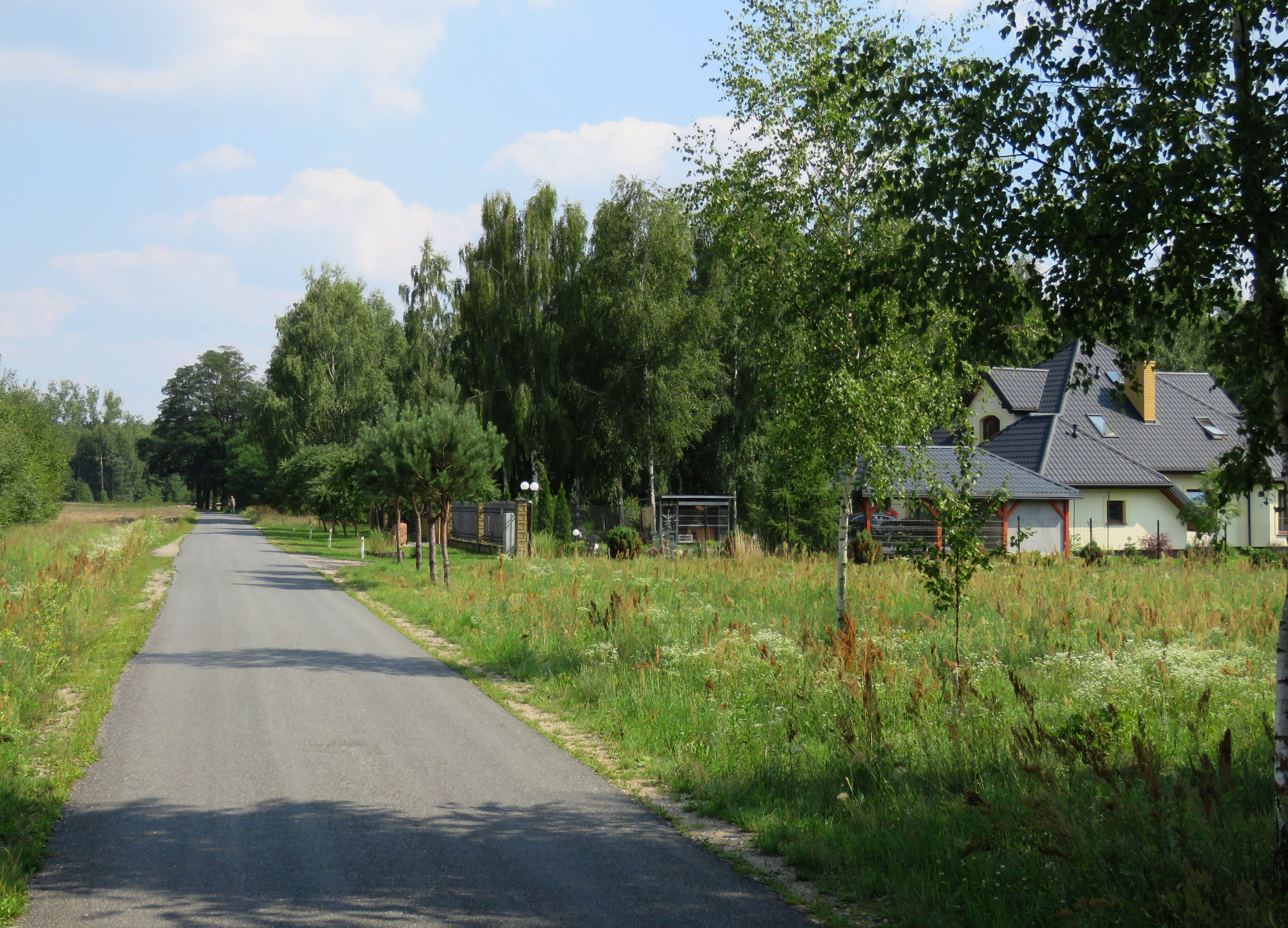

- Location within Poland
- Coordinates: 51°57′12″N 20°38′19″E
- Country: Poland
- Voivodeship: Masovian
- County: Grodzisk
- Gmina: Żabia Wola

Lasek [ˈlasɛk] is a village in the administrative district of Gmina Żabia Wola, within Grodzisk County, Masovian Voivodeship, in east-central Poland.
