= Bartoszówka, Masovian Voivodeship =

Bartoszówka
- Village
- Location within Poland
- Coordinates: 51°58′0″N 20°39′30″E
- Country: Poland
- Voivodeship: Masovian
- County: Grodzisk
- Gmina: Żabia Wola

Bartoszówka [bartɔˈʂufka] is a village in the administrative district of Gmina Żabia Wola, within Grodzisk County, Masovian Voivodeship, in east-central Poland.
