= Redlanka =

- Village
- Location within Poland
- Coordinates: 51°58′N 20°41′E
- Country: Poland
- Voivodeship: Masovian
- County: Grodzisk
- Gmina: Żabia Wola

Redlanka [rɛdˈlaŋka] is a village in the administrative district of Gmina Żabia Wola, within Grodzisk County, Masovian Voivodeship, in east-central Poland.
