= Słubica B =

Village in Gmina Żabia Wola, Poland

- Village
- Location within Poland
- Coordinates: 52°00′19″N 20°37′02″E
- Country: Poland
- Voivodeship: Masovian
- County: Grodzisk
- Gmina: Żabia Wola
- Population: 20

Słubica B is a village in the administrative district of Gmina Żabia Wola, within Grodzisk County, Masovian Voivodeship, in east-central Poland.
