= Lisówek =

Lisówek may refer to:

- Lisówek, Gmina Żabia Wola, Grodzisk County, Masovian Voivodeship, Poland
- Lisówek, Grójec County, Masovian Voivodeship, Poland
