= Słubica A =

Village in Gmina Żabia Wola, Poland

- Village
- Location within Poland
- Coordinates: 52°00′37″N 20°37′18″E
- Country: Poland
- Voivodeship: Masovian
- County: Grodzisk
- Gmina: Żabia Wola
- Population: 20

Słubica A is a village in the administrative district of Gmina Żabia Wola, within Grodzisk County, Masovian Voivodeship, in east-central Poland.
