= Słubica Dobra =

- Village
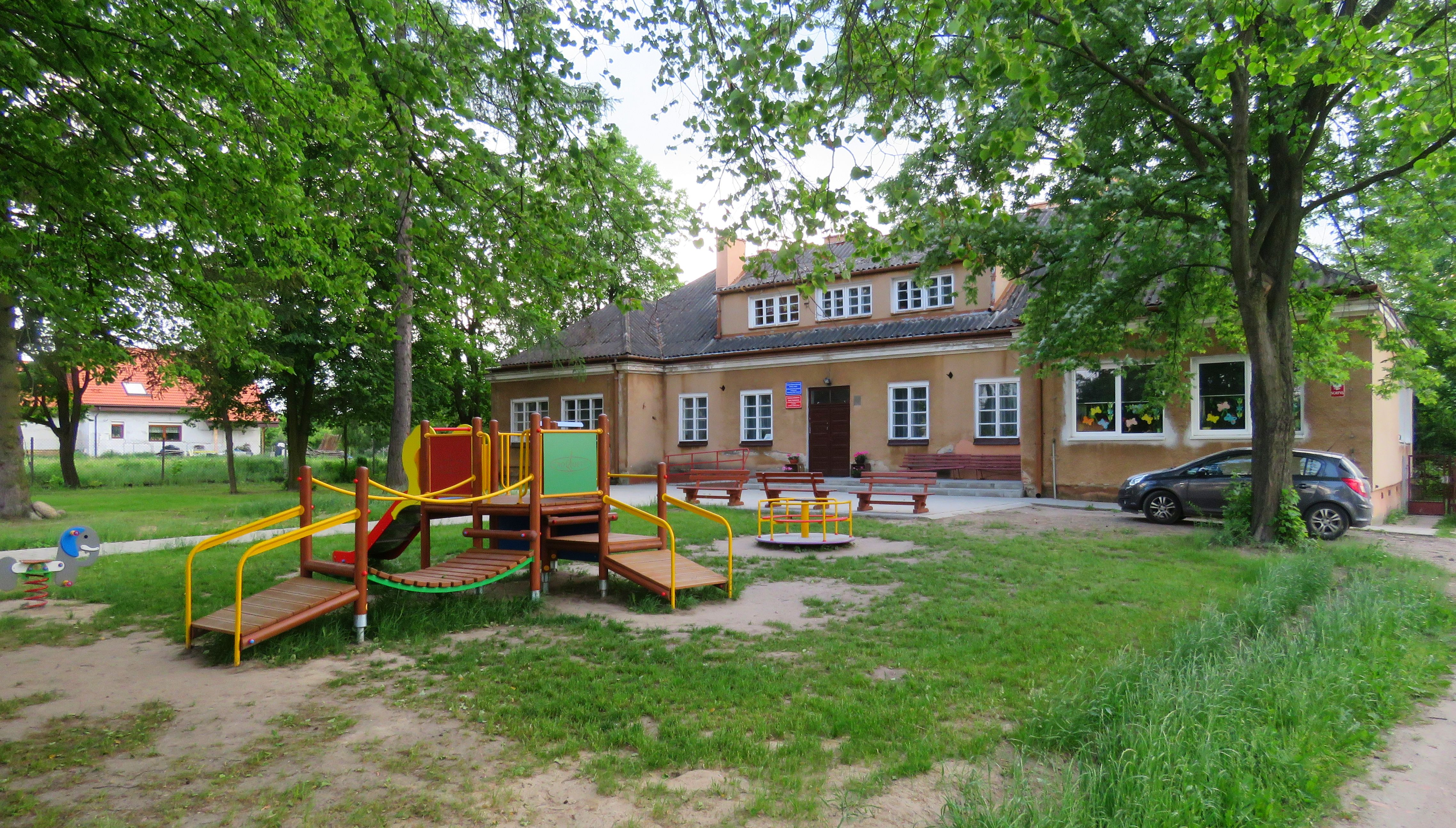

- Location within Poland
- Coordinates: 52°00′47″N 20°38′14″E
- Country: Poland
- Voivodeship: Masovian
- County: Grodzisk
- Gmina: Żabia Wola
- Population: 75

Słubica Dobra [swuˈbit͡sa ˈdɔbra] is a village in the administrative district of Gmina Żabia Wola, within Grodzisk County, Masovian Voivodeship, in east-central Poland.
