= Ojrzanów, Masovian Voivodeship =

Ojrzanów
- Village
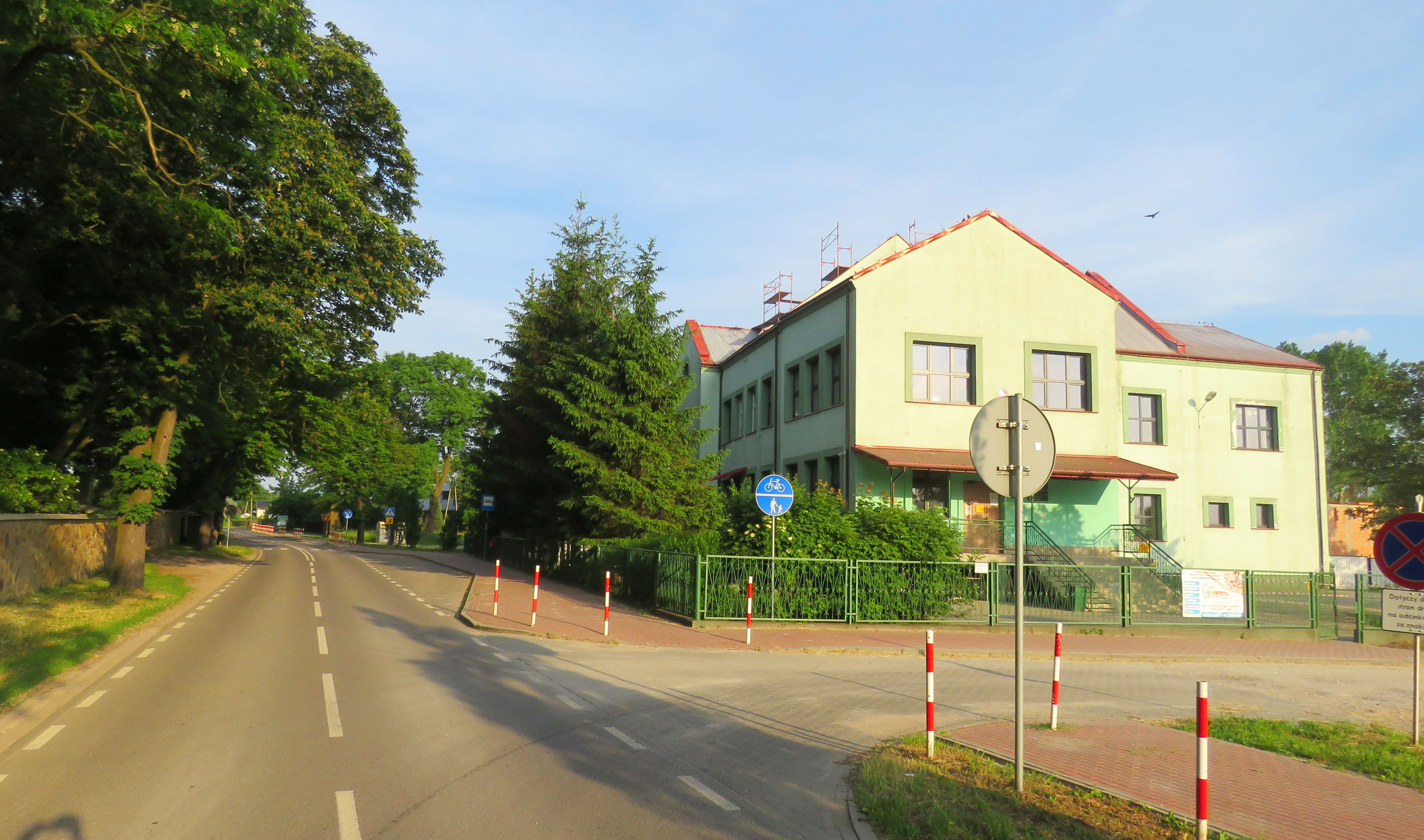

- Location within Poland
- Coordinates: 52°0′N 20°45′E
- Country: Poland
- Voivodeship: Masovian
- County: Grodzisk
- Gmina: Żabia Wola

Ojrzanów [ɔi̯ˈʐanuf] is a village in the administrative district of Gmina Żabia Wola, within Grodzisk County, Masovian Voivodeship, in east-central Poland.
