= Wycinki Osowskie =

- Village
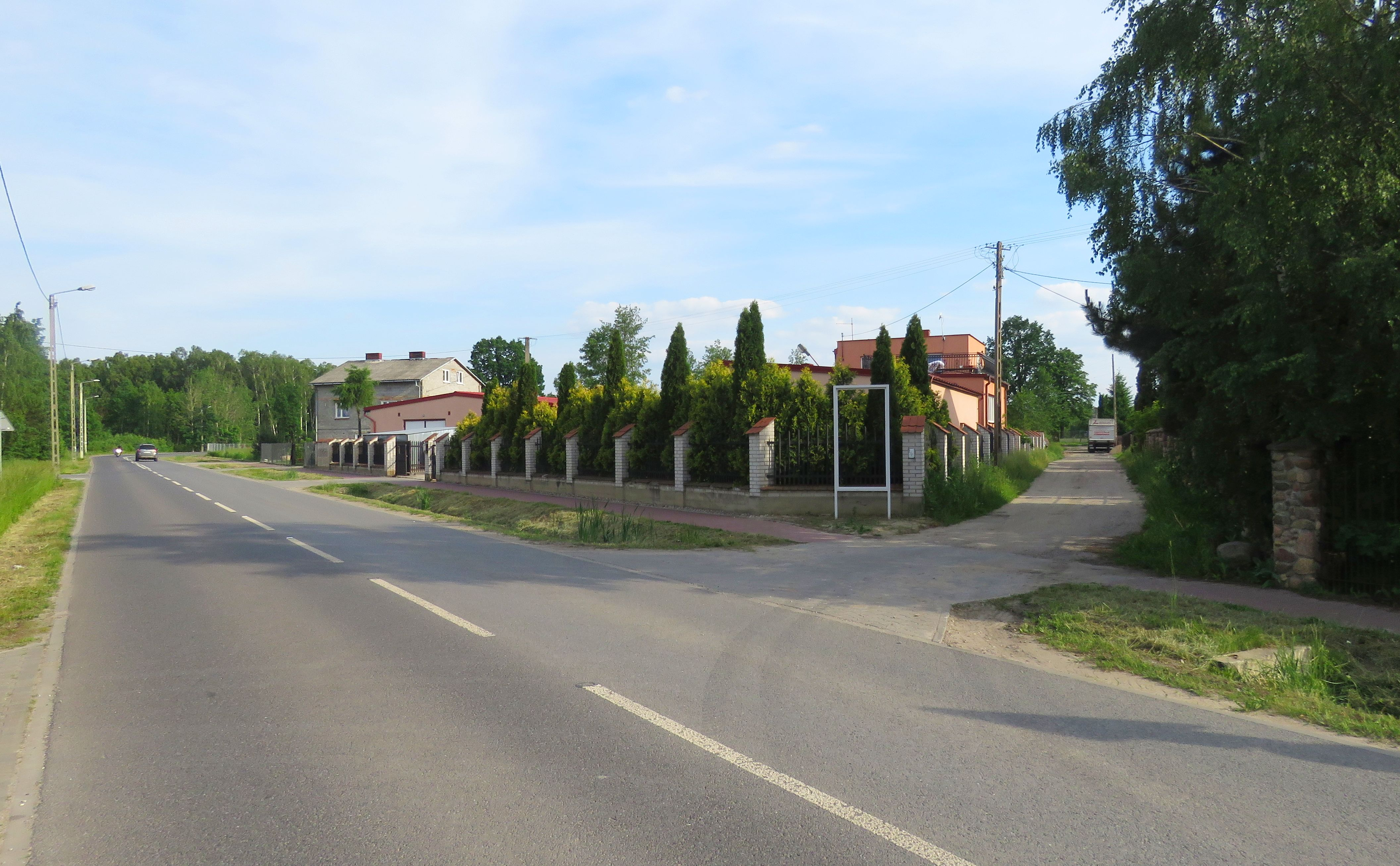

- Location within Poland
- Coordinates: 52°02′20″N 20°40′24″E
- Country: Poland
- Voivodeship: Masovian
- County: Grodzisk
- Gmina: Żabia Wola

Wycinki Osowskie [vɨˈt͡ɕiŋki ɔˈsɔfskʲɛ] is a village in the administrative district of Gmina Żabia Wola, within Grodzisk County, Masovian Voivodeship, in east-central Poland.
