= Przeszkoda, Masovian Voivodeship =

Przeszkoda
- Village
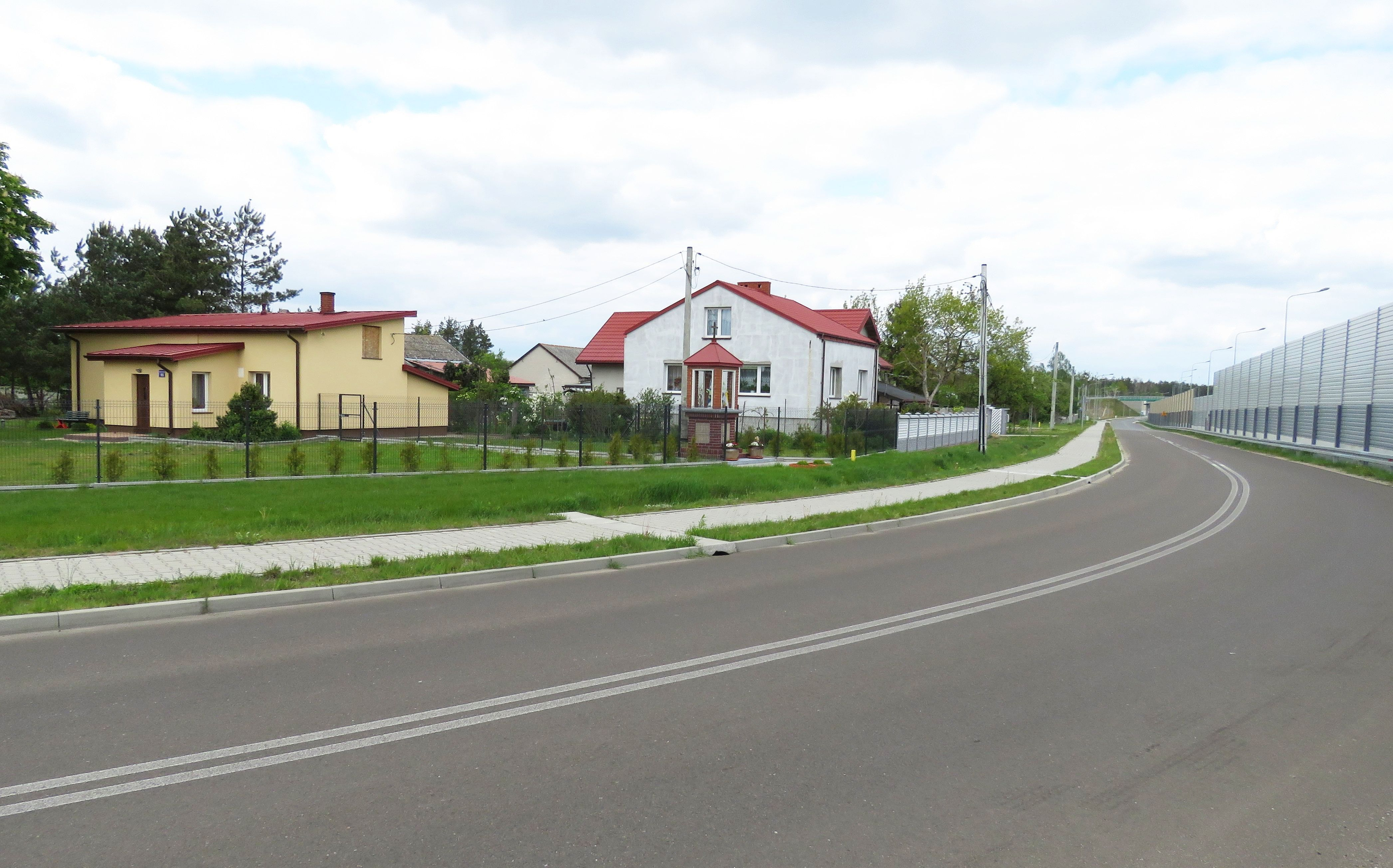
- Major road in Przeszkoda

- Location within Poland
- Coordinates: 52°02′29″N 20°41′57″E
- Country: Poland
- Voivodeship: Masovian
- County: Grodzisk
- Gmina: Żabia Wola

Przeszkoda [pʂɛʂˈkɔda] is a village in the administrative district of Gmina Żabia Wola, within Grodzisk County, Masovian Voivodeship, in east-central Poland.
