= Pruszków mafia =

Polish criminal organization active in the 1990s

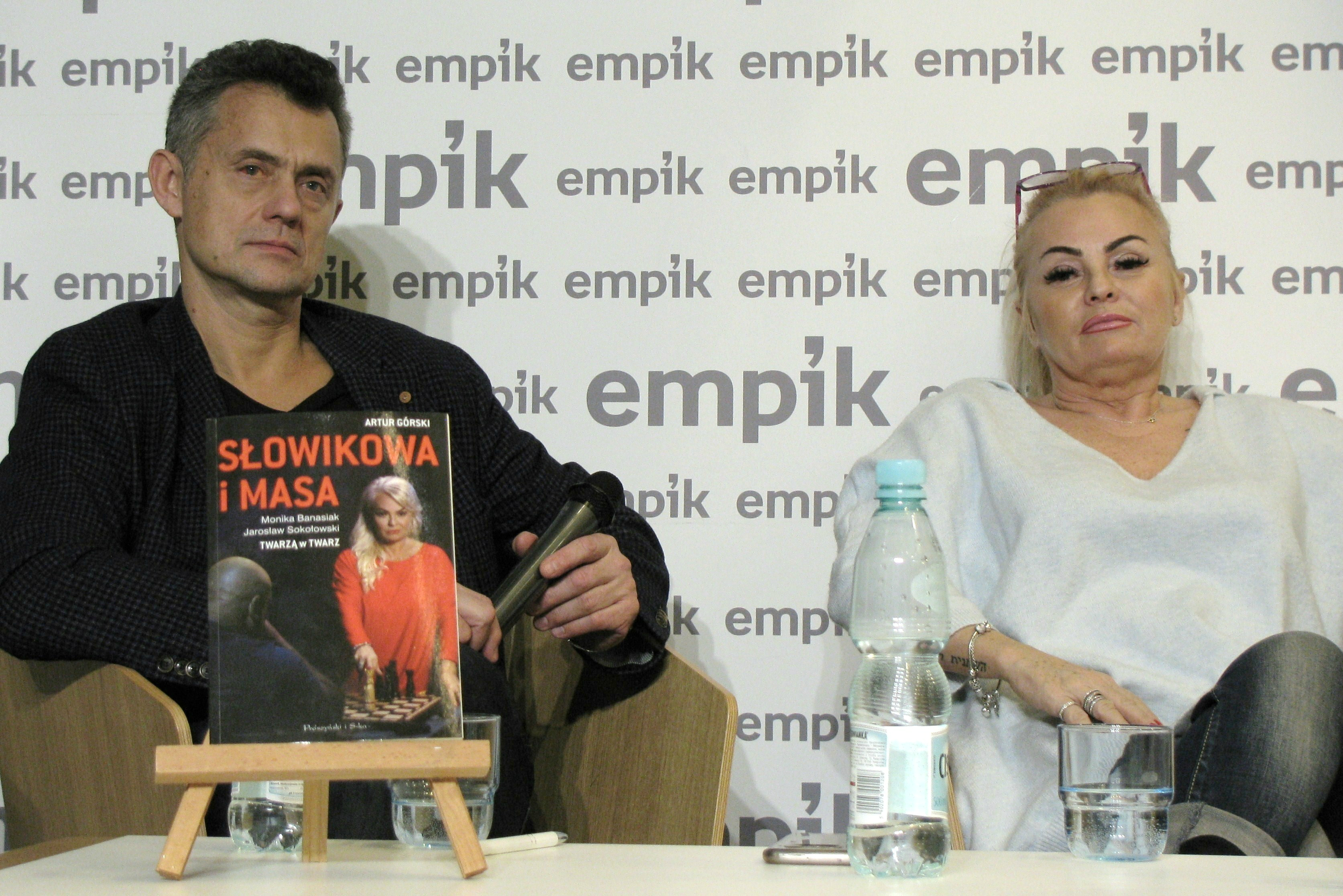
- Artur Górski, a crime journalist, and Monika Banasiak, the wife of one of the leaders of the mafia, presenting Górski's book on the organization, 2017
- Founding location: Pruszków, Poland
- Years active: 1989–2000
- Territory: Primarily in the Warsaw metropolitan area, outlets across the entire country
- Membership: Several hundred
- Criminal activities: Drug trafficking, extortion, kidnapping, weapon trafficking, murder, blackmail, theft
- Rivals: Wołomin mafia

The Pruszków mafia (Polish: mafia pruszkowska or gang pruszkowski) was a Polish criminal organization originating from Pruszków in the 1990s and one of the most infamous in the country's modern history. It was active in the vicinity of the city of Warsaw. The group is known for being involved in large car-theft rings, drug trafficking (including cocaine, heroin, hashish and amphetamine), kidnapping, extortion, weapon trafficking (including AK-47s) and murder. Law enforcement dealt a severe blow to the organization in 2000 with Jarosław "Masa" Sokołowski taking the stance of crown witness. Despite rumors sparked by the release of a few high-ranking members in 2017, the group has not been significantly active since, with many of the freed bosses re-arrested on subsequent charges. Remnants of the group are thought to be involved in car theft and drug distribution but retain no real influence in the area.

== History ==
The group was established as a result of the political transformation in Poland after the dissolution of the Polish People's Republic. The transition of power from a one-party state with its Milicja Obywatelska to a democratic government and the newly-formed Police of Poland allowed for criminal rings to flourish all throughout the country. Its founders were mainly petty criminals, such as shoplifters or currency dealers, who took advantage of the weakened police force to form bigger groups and master more elaborate crimes.

Initially amassing around fifty gangsters, the first few years of the group's existence saw members break off and form their own, opposing organizations (most notably the Wołomin mafia in 1992), as well as outside groups being assimilated. The mafia first rose to prominence in local media in May 1990, when two of its members were found dead alongside the expressway connecting Warsaw to Katowice, commonly referred to as "gierkówka" (named after Edward Gierek, who had commissioned it), in the stretch going through the village Siestrzeń. The alleged perpetrator fled the country in fear of the gang's retaliation, and continues to claim that the men were killed by the "two portly Russians" who were assigned to him as guards. In 2015 he was sentenced to 10 years in prison by the District Court of Warsaw.

The group would also force different criminal entities in Poland to pay "license fees", which were transferred by the heads of organizations to the leaders of the Pruszków mafia. In the first half of the decade the gang based in Ożarów Mazowiecki joined the group.

=== Motel "George" shootout ===
In July 1990, a former accomplice of the mafia arrived in Poland from East Germany to settle an unpaid debt to the group. Members of it had stolen his Mercedes-Benz car and were demanding a ransom of fifteen thousand marks (~20880 US dollars adjusted for inflation). After the Polish police found out about the situation, they arranged an ambush at the planned place of transaction – a motel called "George" near Nadarzyn.

A plainclothes policeman accompanied the owner of the Mercedes to the motel under the guise of a bodyguard. The rest of the police force was stationed in the nearby area, having a helicopter on the ready. The events which happened following the gangsters figuring out the trap are debated. The police's official statement is that the bodyguard – posing policeman was struck in the head with a nunchuck and started firing his handgun in defense, killing one gangster and wounding another. However, during the court case, it was revealed that the policeman was hit from behind, which would imply the Mercedes owner was to blame for it, and therefore it's theorized that the attack was following the officer drawing his gun. What is more, the members of the gang were unarmed, and the casualty, "Szarak", was shot in the back, which implies that he was fleeing, not attacking. Taking these findings into consideration and in light of the police using entrapment (which was illegal in Poland at the time) the five gangsters captured in the motel were acquitted.

== Decline ==
The second half of the decade saw several high ranking members of the gang be killed or apprehended, as murders and executions became more widespread, oftentimes occurring in broad daylight and using non-conventional means, such as explosives. In February 1996, Wojciech "Kiełbasa" Kiełbiński was executed in the streets of Pruszków in a heavily publicized event, while in 1999, Andrzej Kolikowski, the founder of the aforementioned group from Ożarów Mazowiecki, was killed while on vacation in Zakopane.

The event synonymous with the end of the Pruszków mafia is Jarosław "Masa" Sokołowski, a high ranking member in the mafia, becoming a crown witness for the police. Having spent six months in police custody following an accusation of extortion, Sokołowski agreed to testify against the organization in August 2000. The confessions allowed for the conviction of several leaders of the gang, which ultimately led to the group's dissolution. In the same year, a group originating from the Pruszków mafia, known as the Mokotów group, splintered off and continued to act independently until 2014.
