= Huta Żabiowolska =

- Village
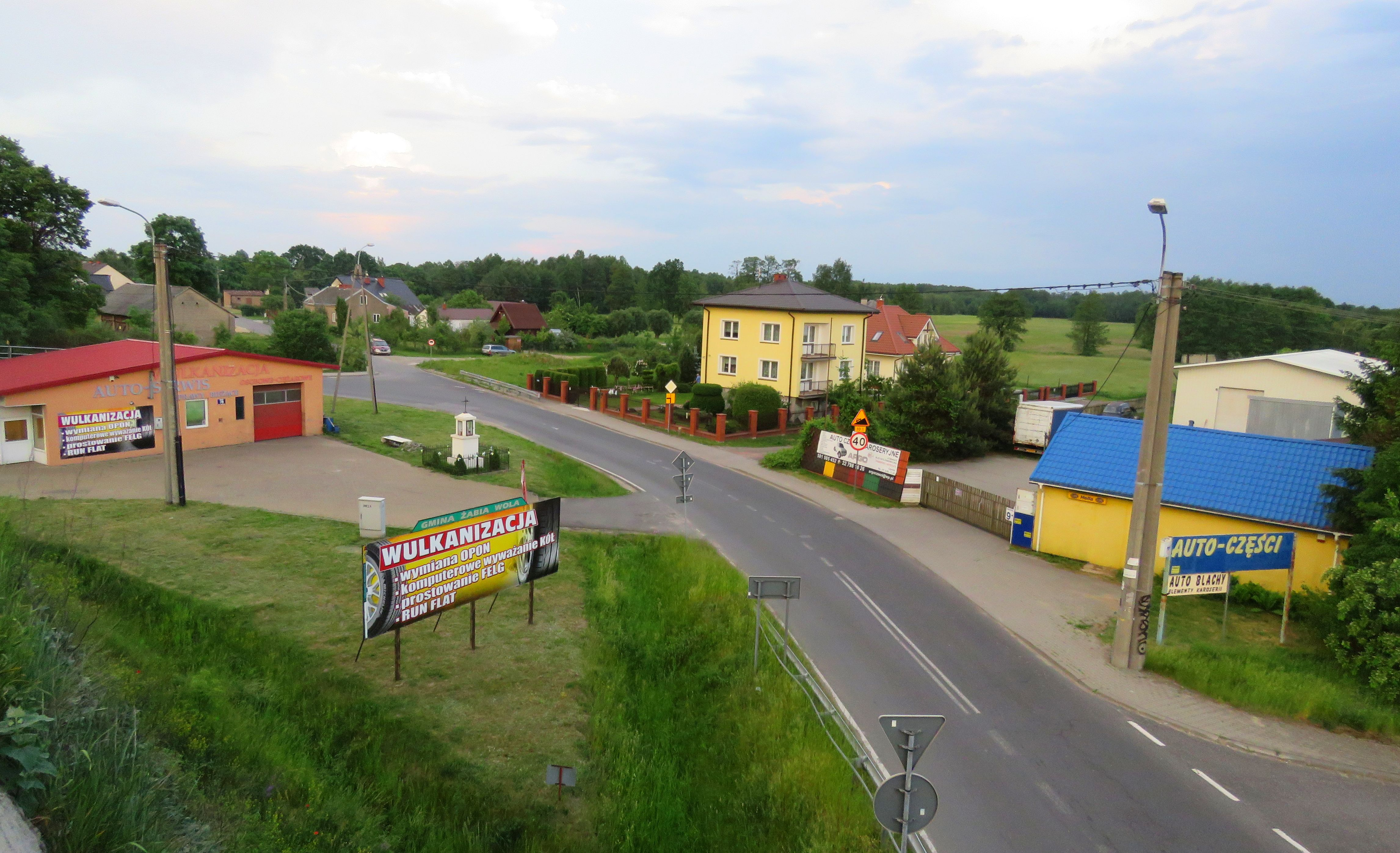

- Location within Poland
- Coordinates: 52°1′38″N 20°40′12″E
- Country: Poland
- Voivodeship: Masovian
- County: Grodzisk
- Gmina: Żabia Wola

Huta Żabiowolska [ˈxuta ʐabjɔˈvɔlska] is a village in the administrative district of Gmina Żabia Wola, within Grodzisk County, Masovian Voivodeship, in east-central Poland.
