= Musuły =

- Village
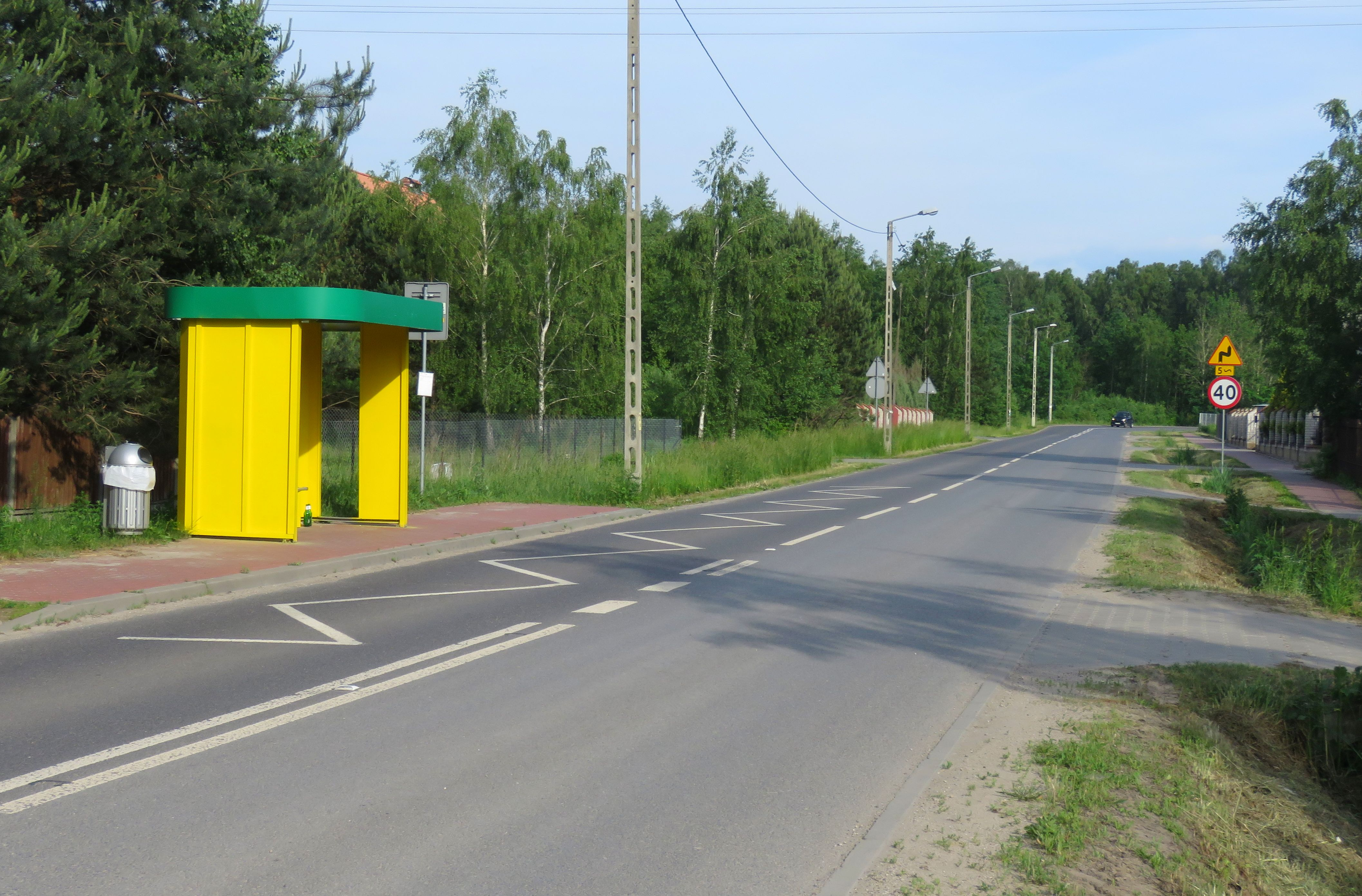

- Location within Poland
- Coordinates: 52°2′58″N 20°39′35″E
- Country: Poland
- Voivodeship: Masovian
- County: Grodzisk
- Gmina: Żabia Wola
- Time zone: UTC+1 (CET)
  - Summer (DST): UTC+2 (CEST)

Musuły [muˈsuwɨ] is a village in the administrative district of Gmina Żabia Wola, within Grodzisk County, Masovian Voivodeship, in east-central Poland.

Five Polish citizens were murdered by Nazi Germany in the village during World War II.
