= Grzegorzewice =

Grzegorzewice may refer to:

- Grzegorzewice, Gmina Żabia Wola, Grodzisk County, Poland
- Grzegorzewice, Grójec County, Poland
