= Niedrzaków =

- Village
- Location within Poland
- Coordinates: 52°20′8″N 19°27′26″E
- Country: Poland
- Voivodeship: Łódź
- County: Kutno
- Gmina: Strzelce

Niedrzaków [ɲɛˈdʐakuf] is a village in the administrative district of Gmina Strzelce, within Kutno County, Łódź Voivodeship, in central Poland.

== Owners ==
During the 17th Century the village belonged to the royal land, but was given to some nobilities.

- Aleksander Petrykowski
- Hieronim Petrykowski (until 1683)
- Jerzy and Zofia Bojemski
