= Władysławów, Gmina Żabia Wola =

Władysławów
- Village
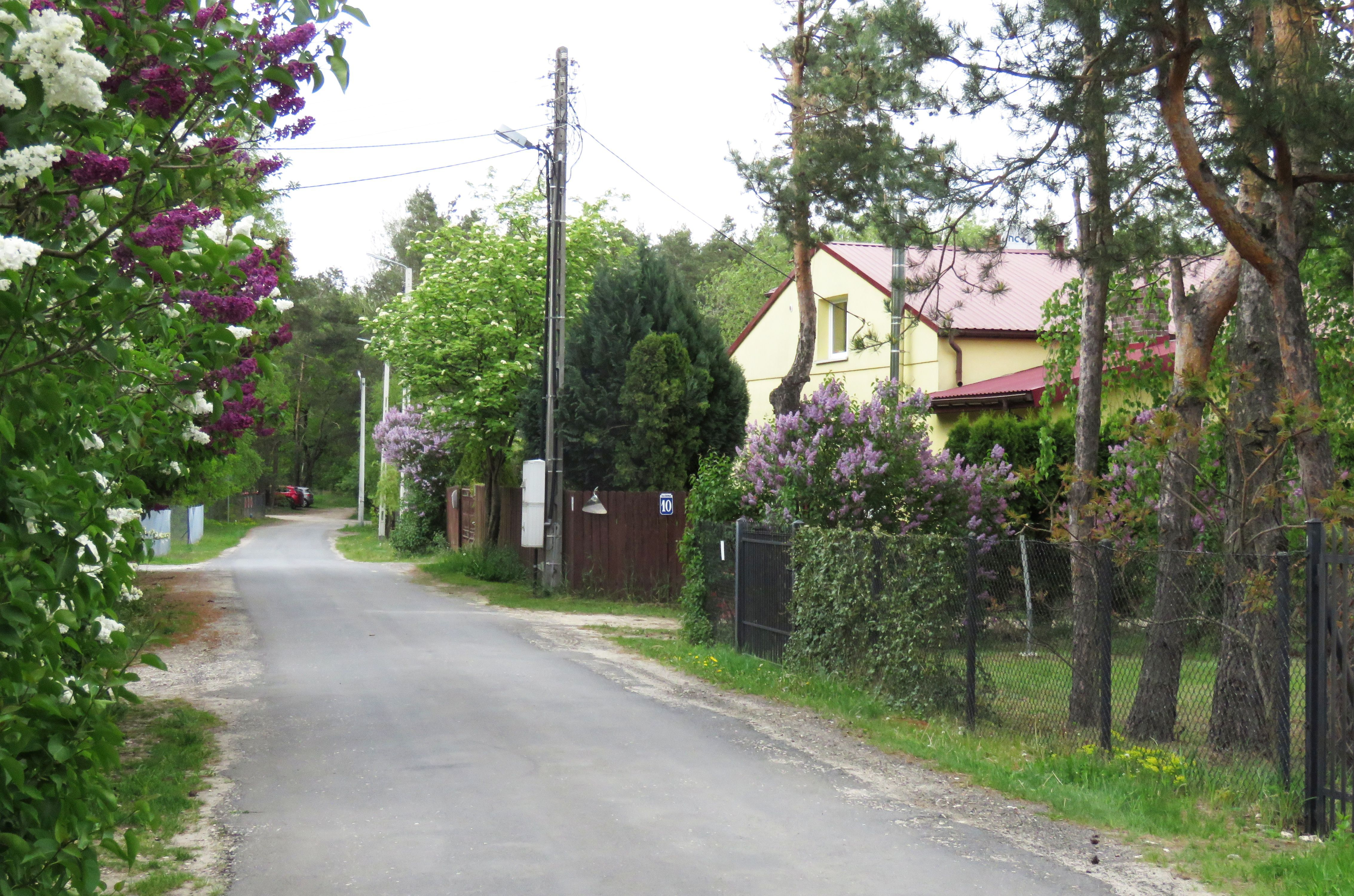

- Location within Poland
- Coordinates: 52°03′09″N 20°42′01″E
- Country: Poland
- Voivodeship: Masovian
- County: Grodzisk
- Gmina: Żabia Wola

Władysławów [vwadɨˈswavuf] is a village in the administrative district of Gmina Żabia Wola, within Grodzisk County, Masovian Voivodeship, in east-central Poland.
