= Żelechów (disambiguation) =

Żelechów is a town in Garwolin County, Masovian Voivodeship (east-central Poland).

Żelechów may also refer to:

- Żelechów, Gmina Żabia Wola, Grodzisk County in Masovian Voivodeship (east-central Poland)
- Żelechów, Grójec County in Masovian Voivodeship (east-central Poland)
- Żelechów, Lubusz Voivodeship (west Poland)
