= Piotrkowice, Gmina Żabia Wola =

Piotrkowice
- Village
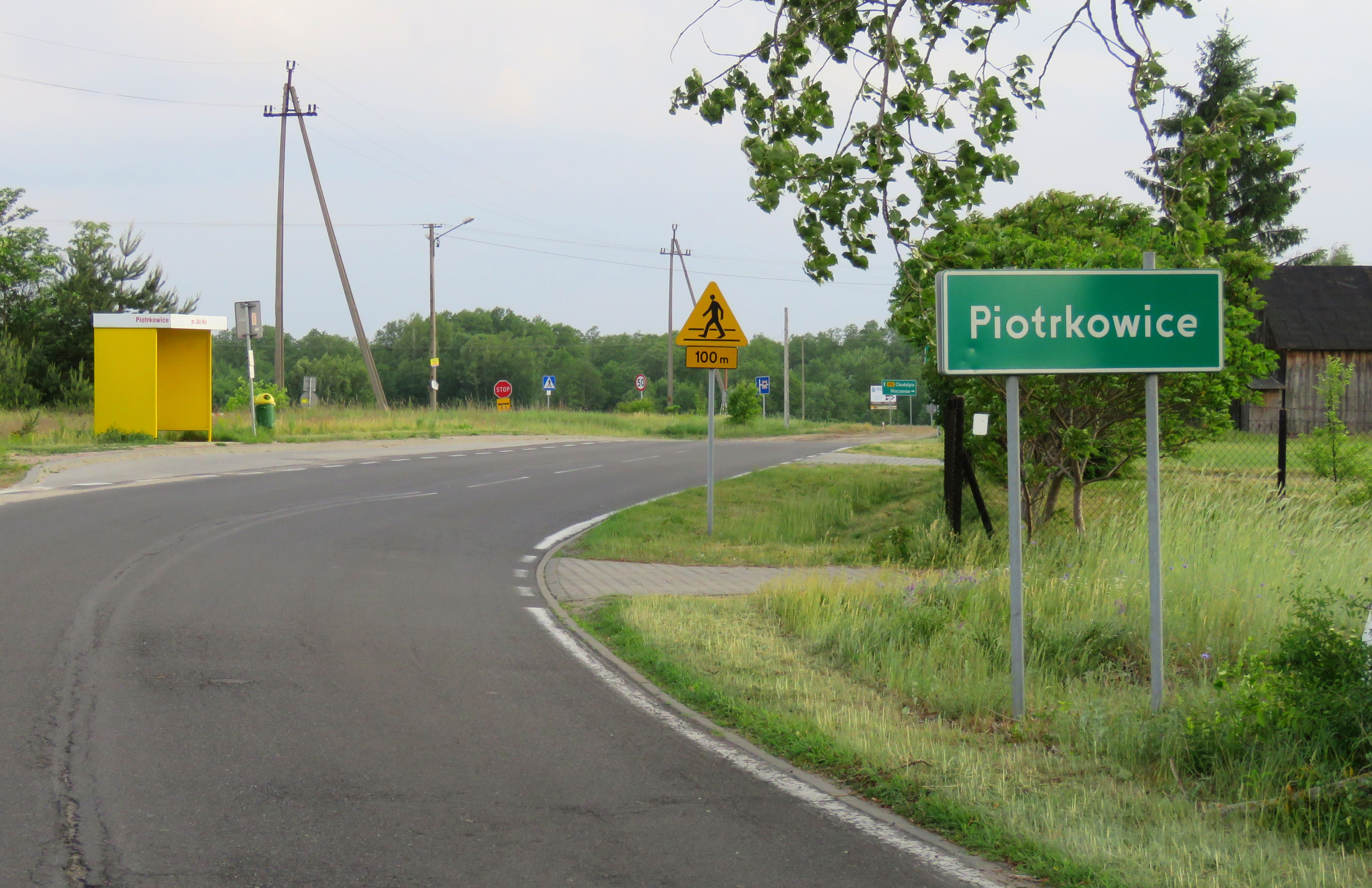

- Location within Poland
- Coordinates: 51°58′N 20°40′E
- Country: Poland
- Voivodeship: Masovian
- County: Grodzisk
- Gmina: Żabia Wola

Piotrkowice [pjɔtrkɔˈvit͡sɛ] is a village in the administrative district of Gmina Żabia Wola, within Grodzisk County, Masovian Voivodeship, in east-central Poland.
