= Grzmiąca, Gmina Żabia Wola =

Grzmiąca
- Village
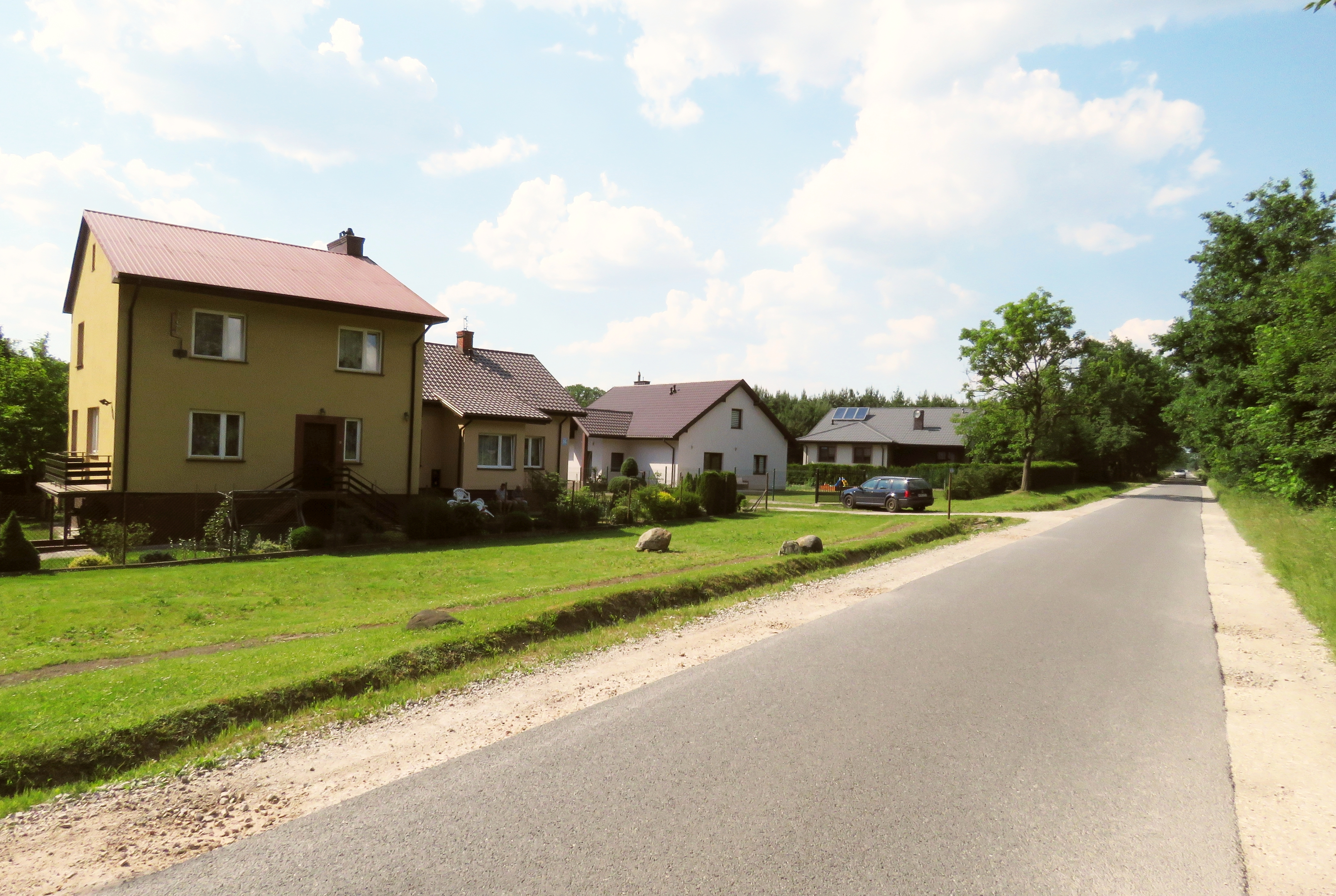
- Houses in Grzmiąca

- Location within Poland
- Coordinates: 52°00′08″N 20°38′58″E
- Country: Poland
- Voivodeship: Masovian
- County: Grodzisk
- Gmina: Żabia Wola

Grzmiąca [ˈɡʐmjɔnt͡sa] is a village in the administrative district of Gmina Żabia Wola, within Grodzisk County, Masovian Voivodeship, in east-central Poland.
