= Józefina, Masovian Voivodeship =

Józefina
- Village
- Location within Poland
- Coordinates: 52°1′46″N 20°39′46″E
- Country: Poland
- Voivodeship: Masovian
- County: Grodzisk
- Gmina: Żabia Wola
- Population: 40

Józefina [juzɛˈfina] is a village in the administrative district of Gmina Żabia Wola, within Grodzisk County, Masovian Voivodeship, in east-central Poland.
