= Ojrzanów-Towarzystwo =

- Village
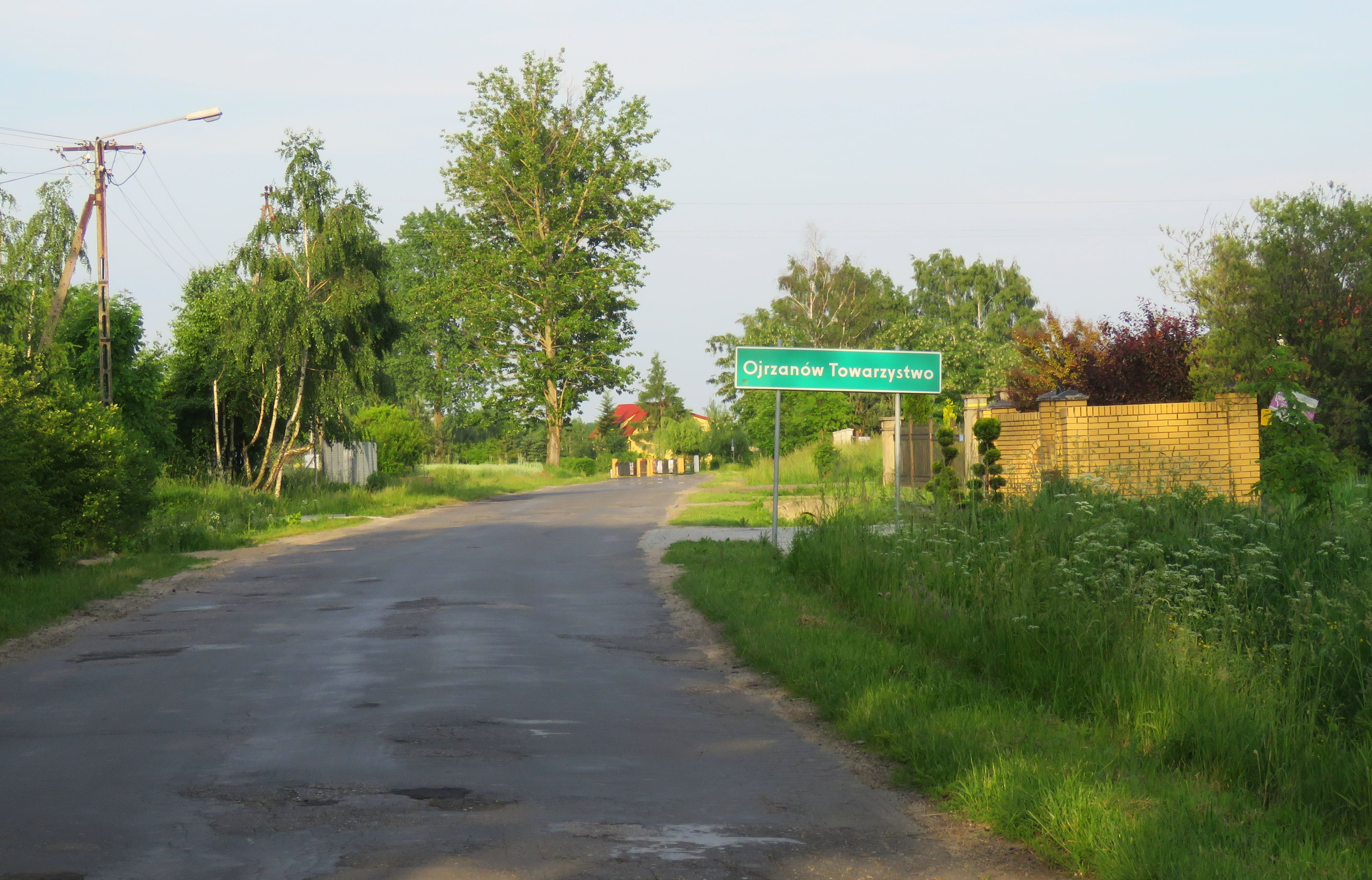

- Location within Poland
- Coordinates: 52°00′34″N 20°43′16″E
- Country: Poland
- Voivodeship: Masovian
- County: Grodzisk
- Gmina: Żabia Wola

Ojrzanów-Towarzystwo [ɔi̯ˈʐanuf tɔvaˈʐɨstfɔ] is a village in the administrative district of Gmina Żabia Wola, within Grodzisk County, Masovian Voivodeship, in east-central Poland.
