= Bieniewiec =

- Village
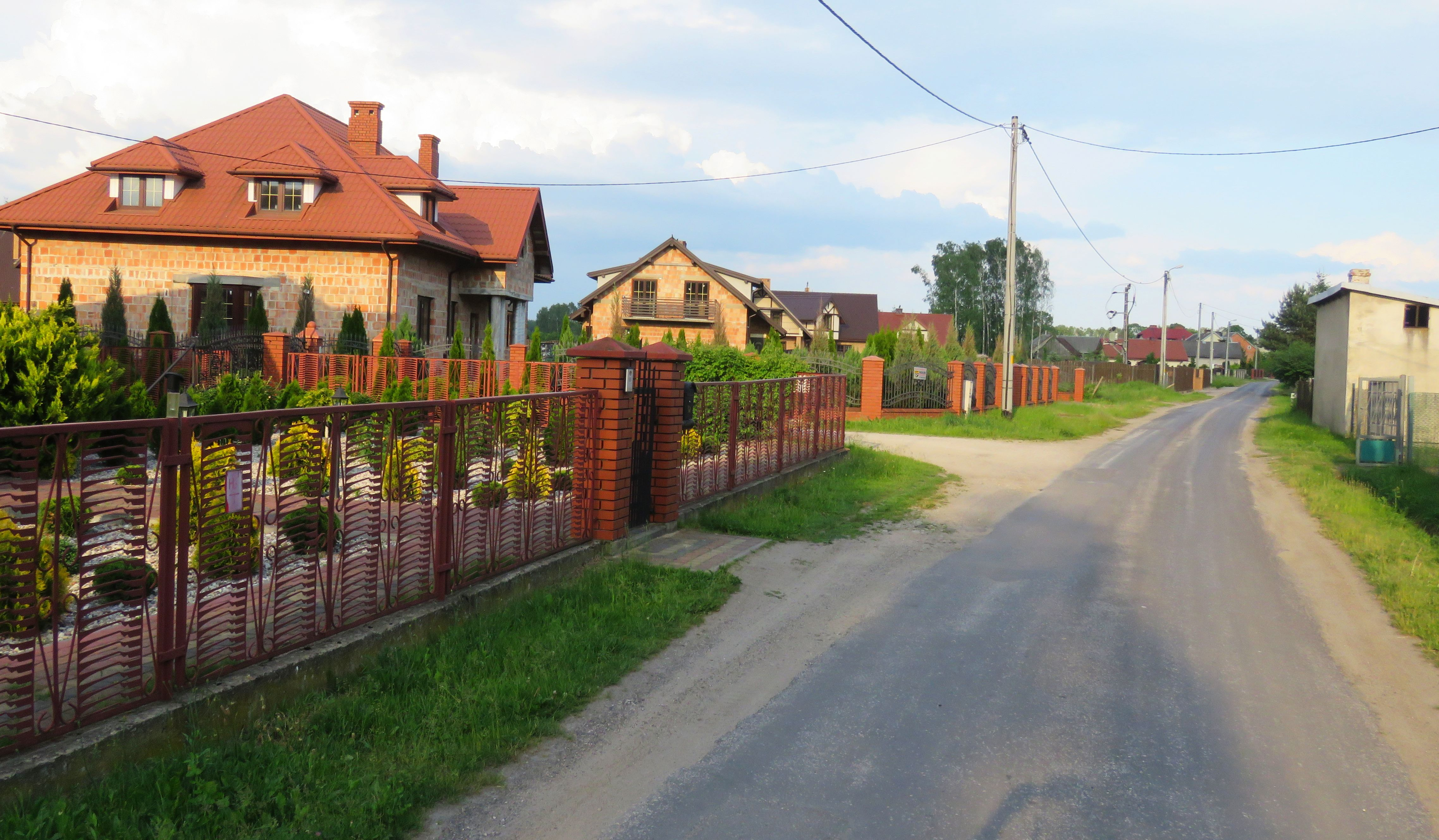

- Location within Poland
- Coordinates: 52°1′N 20°37′E
- Country: Poland
- Voivodeship: Masovian
- County: Grodzisk
- Gmina: Żabia Wola

Bieniewiec [bjɛˈɲɛvjɛt͡s] is a village in the administrative district of Gmina Żabia Wola, within Grodzisk County, Masovian Voivodeship, in east-central Poland.
