= Skuły =

- Village
- Location within Poland
- Coordinates: 51°58′58″N 20°39′26″E
- Country: Poland
- Voivodeship: Masovian
- County: Grodzisk
- Gmina: Żabia Wola
- Elevation: 157 m (515 ft)
- Population: 240

Skuły [ˈskuwɨ] is a village in the administrative district of Gmina Żabia Wola, within Grodzisk County, Masovian Voivodeship, in east-central Poland.
