= Stara Bukówka =

- Village
- Location within Poland
- Coordinates: 52°1′27″N 20°39′5″E
- Country: Poland
- Voivodeship: Masovian
- County: Grodzisk
- Gmina: Żabia Wola
- Population: 50

Stara Bukówka [ˈstara buˈkufka] is a village in the administrative district of Gmina Żabia Wola, within Grodzisk County, Masovian Voivodeship, in east-central Poland.
