= Kaleń, Gmina Żabia Wola =

Kaleń
- Village
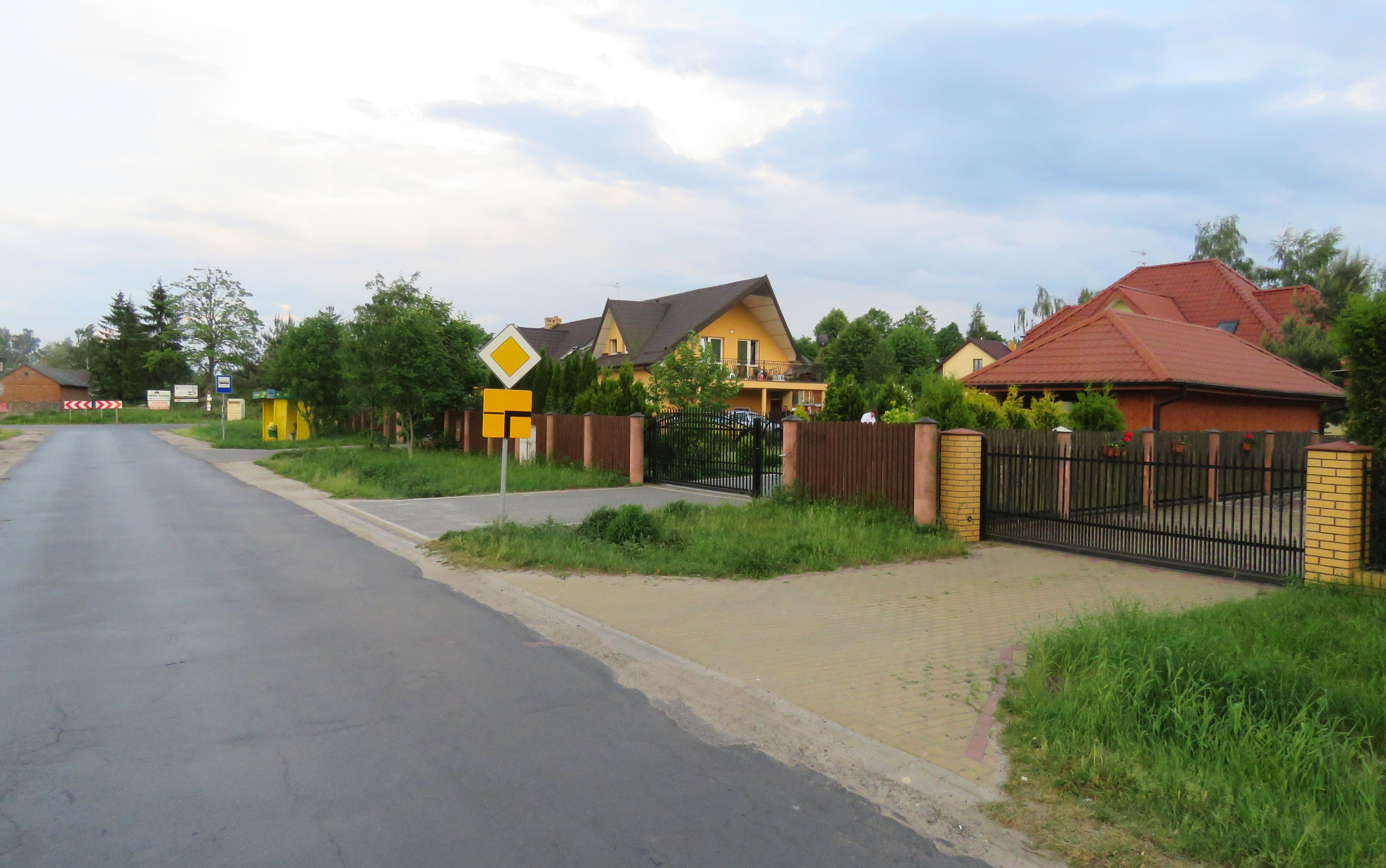

- Location within Poland
- Coordinates: 52°0′34″N 20°41′37″E
- Country: Poland
- Voivodeship: Masovian
- County: Grodzisk
- Gmina: Żabia Wola
- Elevation: 158 m (518 ft)

Kaleń [ˈkalɛɲ] is a village in the administrative district of Gmina Żabia Wola, within Grodzisk County, Masovian Voivodeship, in east-central Poland.
