= Ciepłe =

Ciepłe may refer to:

- Ciepłe, Masovian Voivodeship, Poland
- Ciepłe, Pomeranian Voivodeship, Poland
