= Słubica-Wieś =

- Village
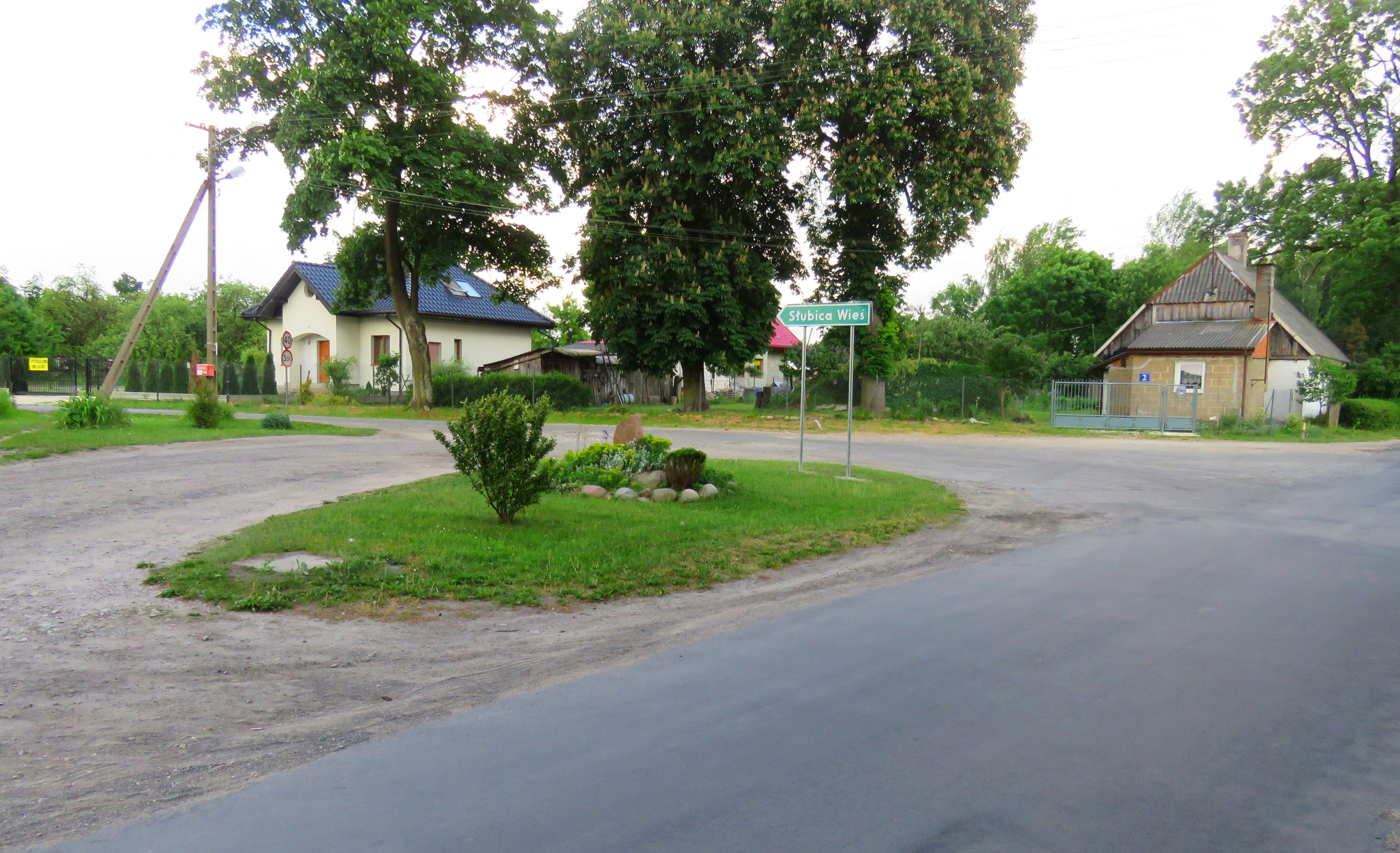

- Location within Poland
- Coordinates: 52°00′18″N 20°38′06″E
- Country: Poland
- Voivodeship: Masovian
- County: Grodzisk
- Gmina: Żabia Wola
- Population: 80

Słubica-Wieś [swuˈbit͡sa ˈvjɛɕ] is a village in the administrative district of Gmina Żabia Wola, within Grodzisk County, Masovian Voivodeship, in east-central Poland.
