= Zalesie, Gmina Żabia Wola =

Zalesie
- Village
- Location within Poland
- Coordinates: 52°3′N 20°41′E
- Country: Poland
- Voivodeship: Masovian
- County: Grodzisk
- Gmina: Żabia Wola
- Postal code: 96-321

Zalesie [zaˈlɛɕɛ] is a village in the administrative district of Gmina Żabia Wola, within Grodzisk County, Masovian Voivodeship, in east-central Poland.
