= Petrykozy, Gmina Żabia Wola =

Petrykozy
- Village
- Location within Poland
- Coordinates: 51°56′48″N 20°39′58″E
- Country: Poland
- Voivodeship: Masovian
- County: Grodzisk
- Gmina: Żabia Wola
- Elevation: 188 m (617 ft)

Petrykozy [pɛtrɨˈkɔzɨ] is a village in the administrative district of Gmina Żabia Wola, within Grodzisk County, Masovian Voivodeship, in east-central Poland.

== Owners of village ==
- Aleksander Petrykowski (d. 1672), a Polish nobleman and envoy to Crimea
