= Ciepłe Pierwsze =

Village in Gmina Żabia Wola, Poland

- Village
- Location within Poland
- Coordinates: 52°00′32″N 20°40′13″E
- Country: Poland
- Voivodeship: Masovian
- County: Grodzisk
- Gmina: Żabia Wola

Ciepłe Pierwsze [ˈt͡ɕɛpwɛ ˈpjɛrfʂɛ] is a village in the administrative district of Gmina Żabia Wola, within Grodzisk County, Masovian Voivodeship, in east-central Poland.
