= Rumianka =

- Village
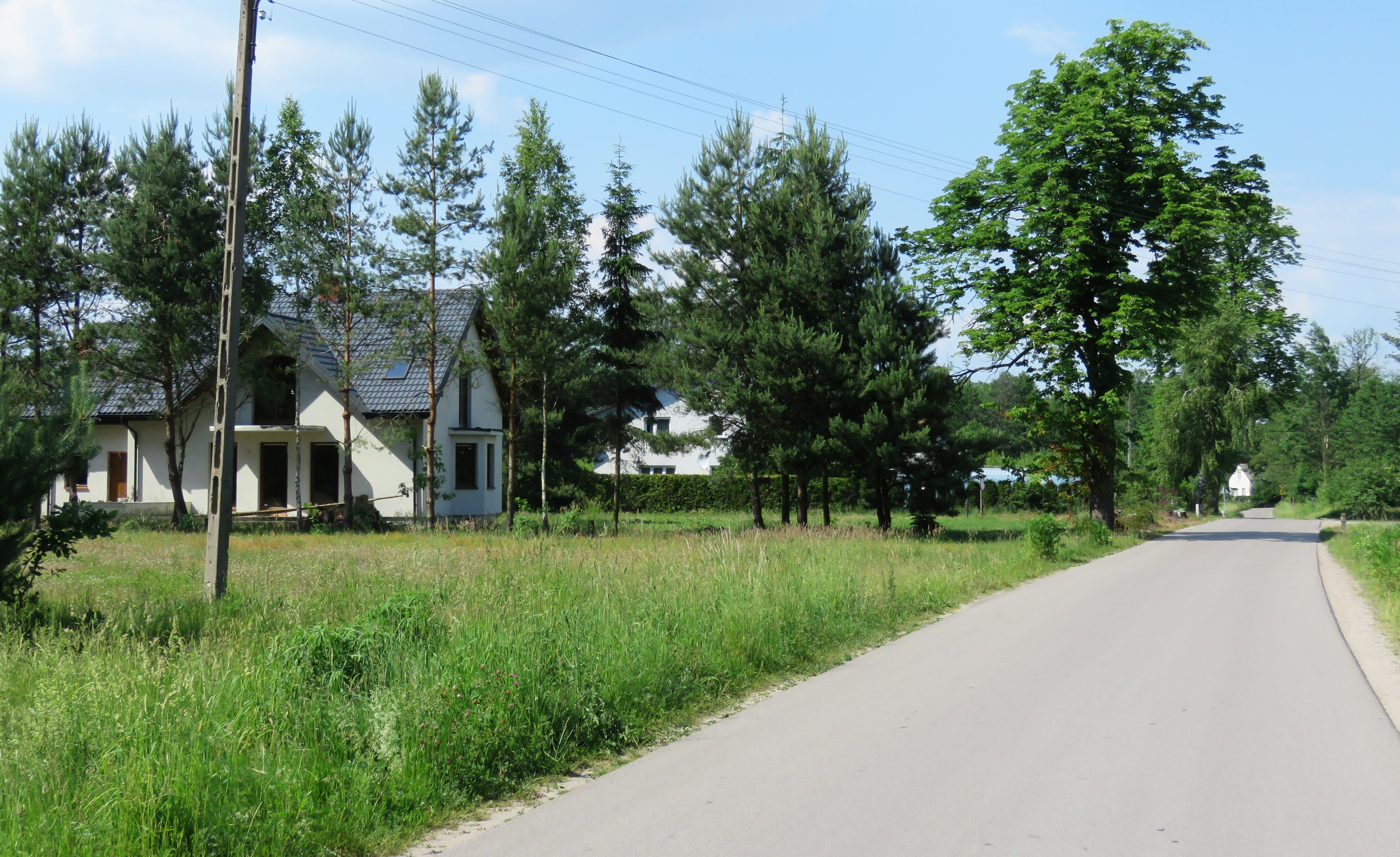
- Roadside houses in Rumianka

- Location within Poland
- Coordinates: 52°00′51″N 20°40′00″E
- Country: Poland
- Voivodeship: Masovian
- County: Grodzisk
- Gmina: Żabia Wola

Rumianka [ruˈmjaŋka] is a village in the administrative district of Gmina Żabia Wola, within Grodzisk County, Masovian Voivodeship, in east-central Poland.
