= Żelechów, Gmina Żabia Wola =

Żelechów
- Village
- Location within Poland
- Coordinates: 52°0′58″N 20°43′52″E
- Country: Poland
- Voivodeship: Masovian
- County: Grodzisk
- Gmina: Żabia Wola
- Elevation: 150 m (490 ft)
- Population: 480

Żelechów [ʐɛˈlɛxuf] is a village in the administrative district of Gmina Żabia Wola, within Grodzisk County, Masovian Voivodeship, in east-central Poland.
