= Lisówek, Gmina Żabia Wola =

Lisówek
- Village
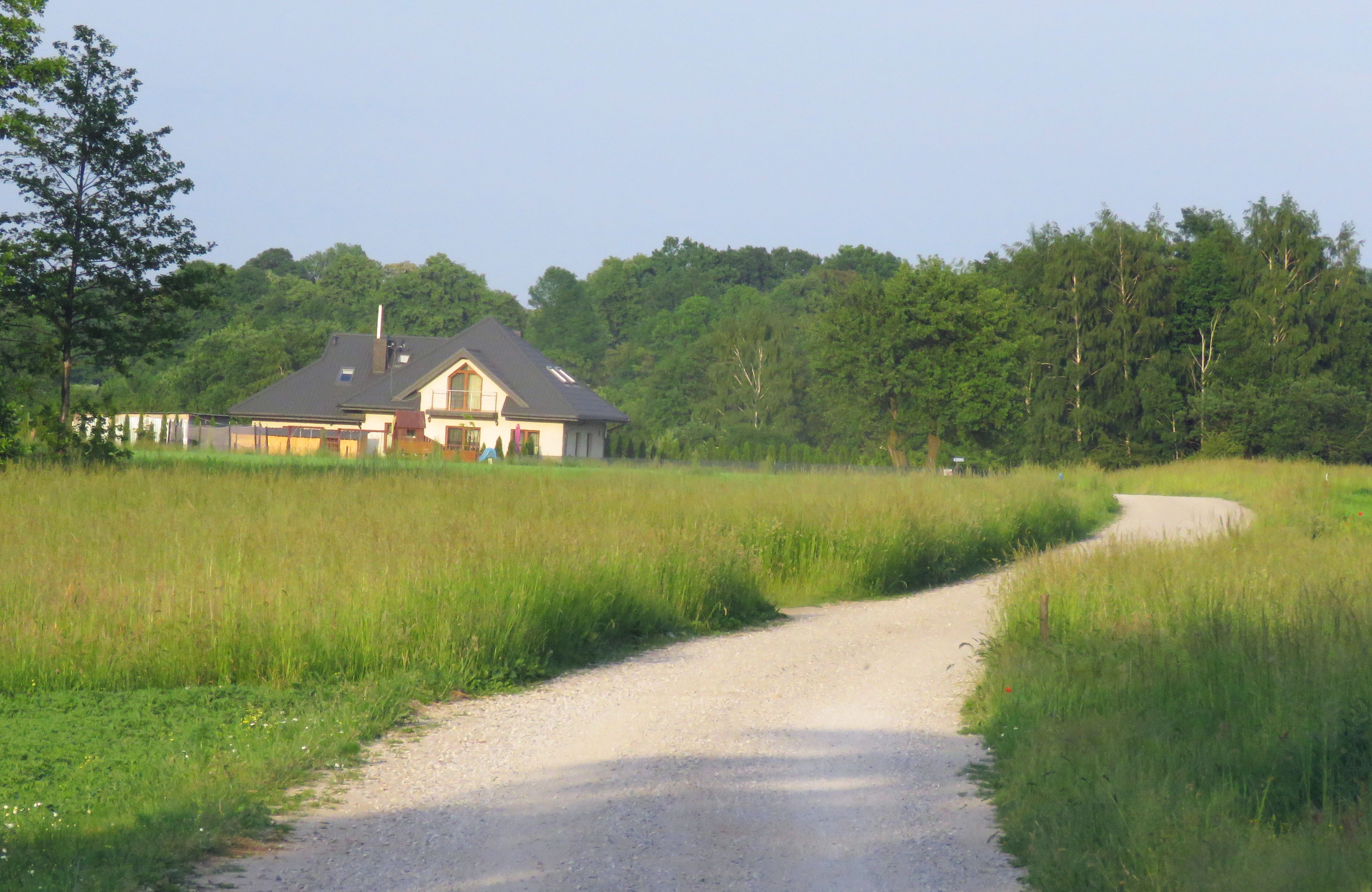

- Location within Poland
- Coordinates: 51°59′57″N 20°42′39″E
- Country: Poland
- Voivodeship: Masovian
- County: Grodzisk
- Gmina: Żabia Wola

Lisówek [liˈsuvɛk] is a village in the administrative district of Gmina Żabia Wola, within Grodzisk County, Masovian Voivodeship, in east-central Poland.
