= Aleksander Petrykowski =

Polish nobleman and envoy

Aleksander Petrykowski (d. 1672) was a Polish nobleman, starost of Nur and envoy to Crimea.

== Family ==
Kasper Niesiecki (d. 1744), a Polish heraldist, wrote his surname as Potrykowski. This version was used by some authors. Karol Szajnocha considered the version Potrykowski as the right one. However modern historians used the version Petrykowski. In biographical entires in the Polski słownik biograficzny Aleksander and his brother were described as Petrykowski (Potrykowski).

Aleksander Petrykowski was a member of the noble family, which used Paprzyca as the coat of arm.

He was son of Walerian Petrykowski. His brother was Hieronim Petrykowski, later podkomorzy of Warsaw (podkomorzy warszawski) and member of parliament (sejm walny) of Polish–Lithuanian Commonwealth.

Aleksander Petrykowski was married to Helena Oleśnicka. He left three children: son Jan and two daughters, Anna, wife of Krzysztof Jarzyna, and Teofila, wife of Bogusław Hulewicz. Jan Petrykowski was later married to Lukrecja Radecka with whom got two children: son Adam and daughter Teofila.

== Life ==
Aleksander inherited the village Petrykozy. In 1648 he was one of electors of king Jan II Kazimierz. On August 21, 1658 he became a podstoli of Warsaw (podstoli warszawski).

In 1660 he received two king's villages in Rawa's voivodeship: Długołęka and Niedrzaków.

On August 8, 1664 he became a podczaszy of Warsaw (podczaszy warszawski). In the same year Petrykowski became a starost of Nur.

In November 1664 he sent as an envoy to the Khan.

He was sent to Khan again in August 1672 to make him a peace broker between Poland and Ottoman.
