= Żabia Wola, Gmina Żabia Wola =

Żabia Wola
- Village
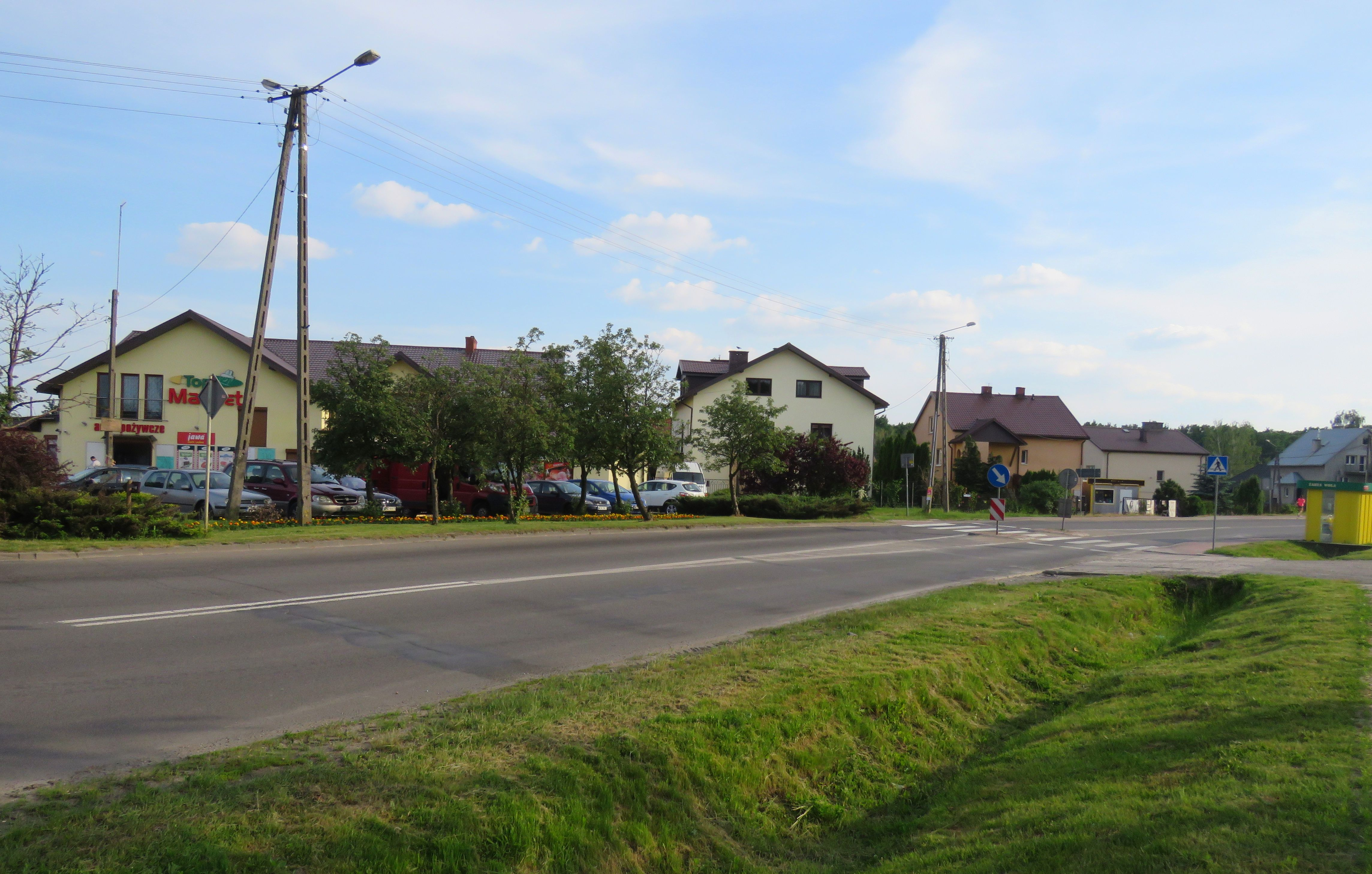

- Location within Poland
- Coordinates: 52°1′53″N 20°41′27″E
- Country: Poland
- Voivodeship: Masovian
- County: Grodzisk
- Gmina: Żabia Wola
- Elevation: 146 m (479 ft)
- Population: 530

Żabia Wola [ˈʐabja ˈvɔla] is a village in Grodzisk County, Masovian Voivodeship, in east-central Poland. It is the seat of the gmina (administrative district) called Gmina Żabia Wola.
