= Gmina Żabia Wola =

Gmina Żabia Wola Żabia Wola Commune
- Gmina
- Coat of arms
- Interactive map of Gmina Żabia Wola
- Coordinates (Żabia Wola): 52°1′53″N 20°41′27″E
- Country: Poland
- Voivodeship: Masovian
- County: Grodzisk
- Seat: Żabia Wola

Area
  - Total: 105.61 km^{2} (40.78 sq mi)

Population (2006)
  - Total: 6,347
  - Density: 60.10/km^{2} (155.7/sq mi)
- Website: https://www.zabiawola.pl

Gmina Żabia Wola is a rural gmina (administrative district) in Grodzisk County, Masovian Voivodeship, in east-central Poland. Its seat is the village of Żabia Wola, which lies approximately 9 kilometres (5 mi) south-east of Grodzisk Mazowiecki and 31 km (19 mi) south-west of Warsaw.

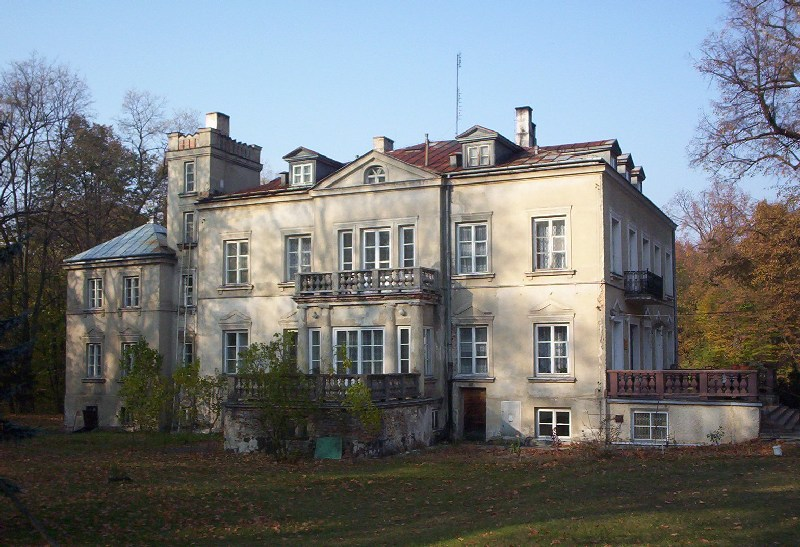

The gmina covers an area of 105.61 square kilometres (40.8 sq mi), and as of 2006 its total population is 6,347.

== Villages ==
Gmina Żabia Wola contains the villages and settlements of Bartoszówka, Bieniewiec, Bolesławek, Ciepłe, Ciepłe Pierwsze, Grzegorzewice, Grzmiąca, Grzymek, Huta Żabiowolska, Jastrzębnik, Józefina, Kaleń, Kaleń-Towarzystwo, Lasek, Lisówek, Musuły, Nowa Bukówka, Oddział, Ojrzanów, Ojrzanów-Towarzystwo, Osowiec, Petrykozy, Pieńki Słubickie, Pieńki Zarębskie, Piotrkowice, Przeszkoda, Redlanka, Rumianka, Siestrzeń, Skuły, Słubica A, Słubica B, Słubica Dobra, Słubica-Wieś, Stara Bukówka, Władysławów, Wycinki Osowskie, Żabia Wola, Zalesie, Zaręby and Żelechów.

== Neighbouring gminas ==
Gmina Żabia Wola is bordered by the gminas of Grodzisk Mazowiecki, Mszczonów, Nadarzyn, Pniewy, Radziejowice and Tarczyn.
