= Hieronim Petrykowski =

Polish nobleman remembered

Hieronim Petrykowski (d. 1716) was a Polish nobleman, podkomorzy of Warsaw (podkomorzy warszawski) and member of parliament (sejm walny) of Polish–Lithuanian Commonwealth.

Hieronim was son of Walerian Petrykowski. His brother was Aleksander Petrykowski. Hieronim Petrykowski was a soldier. He fought in the battle of Chocim in 1673. He was an elector of king Jan III Sobieski. Petrykowski was the member parliament (sejm walny) three times: in 1685, 1691 and 1703. During the civil war in Poland he stayed by the site of king August II. On May 26, 1706 king made him a podkomorzy of Warsaw.

Hieronim Petrykowski was married to Teresa Mokronowska. They had three children: Anna, wife of Wiktoryn Godlewski, łowczy of Nur, Franciszek, łowczy of Warsaw, and Kazimierz.
