= Grodzisk County, Masovian Voivodeship =

Grodzisk County Powiat grodziski
- County
- Flag Coat of arms

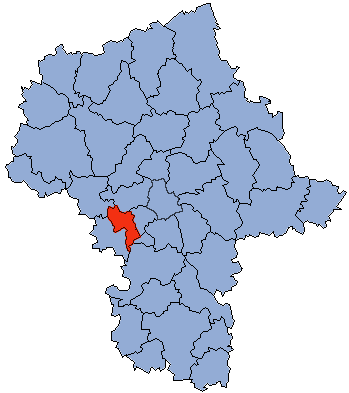
- Location within the voivodeship

- Division into gminas
- Coordinates (Grodzisk Mazowiecki): 52°6′32″N 20°37′30″E
- Country: Poland
- Voivodeship: Masovian
- Seat: Grodzisk Mazowiecki
- Gminas: Total 6 (incl. 2 urban): Milanówek; Podkowa Leśna; Gmina Baranów; Gmina Grodzisk Mazowiecki; Gmina Jaktorów; Gmina Żabia Wola

Area
  - Total: 366.87 km^{2} (141.65 sq mi)

Population (2019)
  - Total: 93,570
  - Density: 255.0/km^{2} (660.6/sq mi)
  - Urban: 51,967
  - Rural: 41,603
- Car plates: WGM
- Website: www.powiat-grodziski.pl

Grodzisk County (Polish: powiat grodziski) is a unit of territorial administration and local government (powiat) in Masovian Voivodeship, east-central Poland. It came into being on 1 January 1999, as a result of the Polish local government reforms passed in 1998. Its administrative seat and largest town is Grodzisk Mazowiecki, which lies 29 kilometres (18 mi) south-west of Warsaw. The county also contains the towns of Milanówek, lying 2 km (1 mi) north-east of Grodzisk Mazowiecki, and Podkowa Leśna, 8 km (5 mi) east of Grodzisk Mazowiecki.

The county covers an area of 366.87 square kilometres (141.6 sq mi). As of 2019 its total population is 93,570, out of which the population of Grodzisk Mazowiecki is 31,782, that of Milanówek is 16,334, that of Podkowa Leśna is 3,851, and the rural population is 41,603.

== Neighbouring counties ==
Grodzisk County is bordered by Warsaw West County to the north-east, Pruszków County and Piaseczno County to the east, Grójec County to the south, and Żyrardów County and Sochaczew County to the west.

== Administrative divisions ==
The county is subdivided into six gminas (two urban, one urban-rural and three rural). These are listed in the following table, in descending order of population.

Gmina	Type	Area (km^{2})	Population (2019)	Seat
Gmina Grodzisk Mazowiecki	urban-rural	107.0	48,202	Grodzisk Mazowiecki
Milanówek	urban	13.5	16,334	
Gmina Jaktorów	rural	55.2	12,428	Jaktorów
Gmina Żabia Wola	rural	105.6	8,859	Żabia Wola
Gmina Baranów	rural	75.4	3,896	Baranów
Podkowa Leśna	urban	10.1	3,851	
