= Budy Michałowskie =

Budy Michałowskie may refer to:

- Budy Michałowskie, Gmina Jaktorów, Grodzisk County
- Budy Michałowskie, Grójec County
