= Stare Biskupice =

Stare Biskupice may refer to:

- Stare Biskupice, Lubusz Voivodeship, Poland
- Stare Biskupice, Masovian Voivodeship, Poland

== See also ==
- Nowe Biskupice (disambiguation)
- Biskupice (disambiguation)
