= Kołaczek =

Kołaczek may refer to:

- Kołaczek, Masovian Voivodeship, Poland
- Kołaczek, West Pomeranian Voivodeship, Poland
