= Battle of Kozienice =

- Part of the Deluge
Date	6 April 1656
Location	Kozienice, Polish-Lithuanian Commonwealth
Result	Polish-Lithuanian victory

Belligerents
Polish–Lithuanian Commonwealth	Swedish Empire

Commanders and leaders
Stefan Czarniecki	(Swedish Empire) Tornskjöld †

Strength
Unknown	300

Casualties and losses
56 killed	240 killed 32 wounded

The Battle of Kozienice happened on the 6 April 1656 near the town of Kozienice between the troops of Stefan Czarniecki and the rear guard of the troops of Margrave Frederick of Baden. It was the prelude to the Battle of Warka fought a day later.

== Battle ==
On 6 April, Czarniecki's troops reached Zwoleń, where he learned of the retreat of Frederick of Baden, who had originally rushed to the aid of Karol Gustav, trapped in a camp at the forks of the San and Vistula. Czarniecki immediately decided to give chase and, near Kozienice, struck at the Swedish artillery consisting of 240 raiders and dragoons under the command of Tornskjöld. The fight lasted for a few hours and ended with the dispersal of the 300 man Swedish unit.

On hearing that the rear guard had been defeated, the margrave hastened his retreat, and on the night of 6-7 April reached Warka, where he was joined by Ritter's troop, drawing from Radom with several hundred carts full of the spoils of war. It took all night to get the wagons across the Pilica, until finally, in the morning, the Swedes destroyed the bridges, and the margrave himself set off for Warsaw.

== Aftermath ==
In the meantime, Czarniecki was joined in Kozienice by Jerzy Lubomirski and at night his troops set off for Warka, where they arrived at dawn on 7 April. Over here the Battle of Warka started

The battle of Kozienice was described by Henryk Sienkiewicz in his novel Potop:

Finally, near Kozienice, they ran into eight Swedish banners, led by Torneskild. Laudanska, marching in front, was the first to spot the enemy, and without even taking a breath immediately jumped towards them. Second went Szandarowski, third Wąsowicz, fourth Stapkowski. Thinking they were dealing with some sort of party, the Swedes put up an open front, and two hours later there was not a living soul left who could run up to the Margrave and shout that it was Czarniecki. They simply swept away the eight banners on their sabres, leaving no witness to the defeat. Then they set off, as if someone had thrown a sickle, to Magnuszewo, as the spies informed them that the Margrave of Baden with his entire army was in Warka.
