= Budy Zosine =

- Village
- Location within Poland
- Coordinates: 52°5′46″N 20°31′2″E
- Country: Poland
- Voivodeship: Masovian
- County: Grodzisk
- Gmina: Jaktorów
- Population: 410

Budy Zosine [ˈbudɨ zɔˈɕinɛ] is a village in the administrative district of Gmina Jaktorów, within Grodzisk County, Masovian Voivodeship, in east-central Poland. It is approximately 2 km (1 mi) north of Jaktorów, 8 km (5 mi) west of Grodzisk Mazowiecki, and 36 km (22 mi) west of Warsaw.
