= Grażyna (disambiguation) =

Grażyna is a Polish given name.

Grażyna may also refer to:

- Grażyna, Masovian Voivodeship, a village in Poland
- "Grażyna" (poem), an 1823 poem by Adam Mickiewicz
- Grazyna Bluff, rock bluff in the south part of Turks Head Ridge, Ross Island, Antarctica
