= Kuba Szmajkowski =

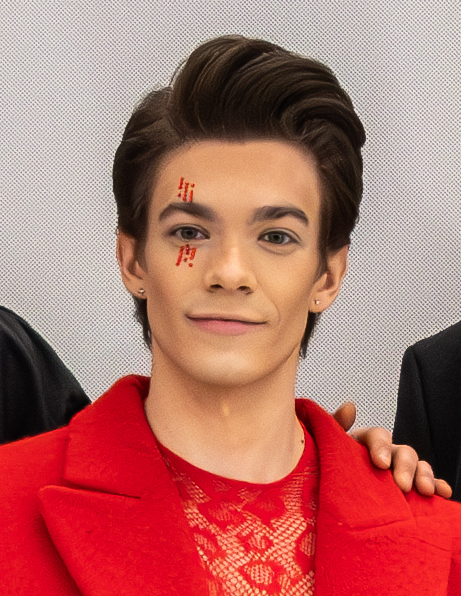
- Kuba Szmajkowski in 2025

Background information
- Born: Jakub Grzegorz Szmajkowski; April 24, 2002 (age 24); Międzyborów, Poland
- Years active: 2021-present (as solo artist)
- Formerly of: 4Dreamers

Jakub Grzegorz Szmajkowski (born April 24, 2002), professionally known as Kuba Szmajkowski or simply Kuba is a Polish singer and songwriter.

== Early life ==
He was born on April 24, 2002 in Międzyborów, Poland. He has a younger sister, Aleksandra. For several years, he played in the volleyball club LKS Wrzos Międzyborów.

== The Voice Kids ==
In 2017, he became a finalist of the first edition of the TVP2 program The Voice Kids. After the end of the program, together with Mateusz Gędek, Tomasz Gregorczyk and Maks Więckowski, he became the vocalist of the boy band 4Dreamers, with whom he released two studio albums: 4Dreamers (2018) and nb. (2019); both releases were listed on the Polish record sales list and were nominated for the Fryderyk Polish phonographic industry award.

== Solo career ==
After the band separated in 2021, he recorded a duet with Sara James, the song "Czarny młyn" for the soundtrack to the film of the same title. Then he released the singles: "Nieskończone" and "Lovesick", and with the second of the songs he took fourth place in the final of the program Tu bije serce Europy! We choose a hit for Eurovision!

In February 2023, he released the singles: "Do the Dance" and "You Do Me", and with the second song he took eighth place in the final of the next edition of the program Tu bił serca Europy! We choose a hit for Eurovision! In the same year, he won the final of the 19th edition of the program Twoja Twarz Brzmi znajomo. By the end of the year, he released a music video for the single "Pocałunek słońca", the song "Running with Lightning", which he recorded in a duet with Liamoo and a cover of the song by the band Kombii "Randez Vous" with the producer duo Mike&Laurent, and on November 11, he performed at a concert organized by RMF FM as part of the National Singing of White and Red Hits in Kraków. On February 14, 2025, with the song "Pray", he took fifth place in the final of the Polish eliminations for the 69th Eurovision Song Contest alongside other artists such as Justyna Steczkowska and Daria Marx.

He declares himself as a person who believes in God, raised in the Catholic spirit; He often prays individually, but rarely attends church services.

== Discography ==
=== Singles ===
Rok	Tytuł	Best position in Polish charts	Album
2021	„Czarny młyn” (feat. Sara James)	–	Czarny młyn (ścieżka dźwiękowa)
2021	„Nieskończone”	–	–
2021	„Lovesick” (feat. Jhn McFly)	–	–
2023	„Do the Dance”	–	–
2023	„You Do Me”	–	–
2023	„Randez Vous” (feat. Mike & Laurent i Kombii)	–	–
2023	„Pocałunek słońca”	–	–
2023	„Running with Lightning” (feat. Liamoo)	14	–
2023	„Święta marzeń”	–	–
2024	„Lights Go Loud”	–	–
2025	„Pray”	–	–
„–” means that the song did not chart in that country

== See also ==
- List of Polish musicians and musical groups
- The Voice Kids (Polish TV series) series 1
