= Nowe Biskupice =

Nowe Biskupice may refer to:

- Nowe Biskupice, Lubusz Voivodeship, Poland
- Nowe Biskupice, Masovian Voivodeship, Poland

== See also ==
- Stare Biskupice (disambiguation)
- Biskupice (disambiguation)
