= Chylice =

Chylice may refer to:

- Chylice, Gmina Jaktorów, Grodzisk County, Poland
- Chylice, Piaseczno County, Poland
