= Pilica, Masovian Voivodeship =

Pilica
- Village
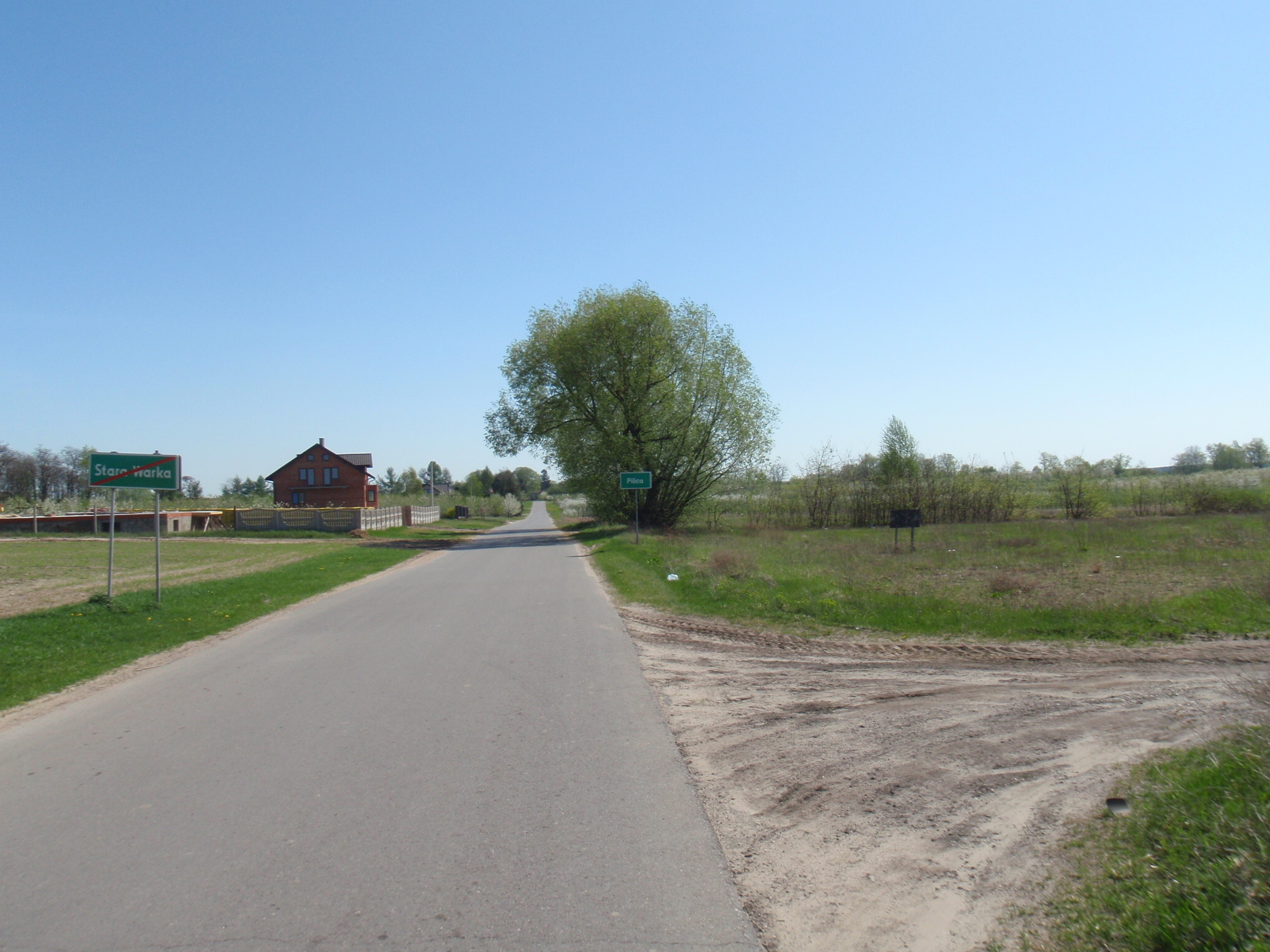
- Entering Pilica from Stara Warka

- Location within Poland
- Coordinates: 51°48′30″N 21°15′30″E
- Country: Poland
- Voivodeship: Masovian
- County: Grójec
- Gmina: Warka
- Population: 210

Pilica (Polish pronunciation: [piˈlit͡sa]) is a village in the administrative district of Gmina Warka, within Grójec County, Masovian Voivodeship, in east-central Poland.

The village lies on the higher, left bank of the Pilica River, about 9 km (6 mi) upstream from where it now joins the Vistula. In the Middle Ages, the settlement's location on the western scarp of the Vistula River valley marked the then confluence of the two rivers, resulting in the village sharing the name of the river; however there is another small town also called Pilica, which lies near the source of the same river.

During World War II the area was heavily fought over and the village was in the front line for five months from the beginning of August 1944 when the Soviet army established a strategic bridgehead at Magnuszew on the west bank of the Vistula, followed by German counterattacks, until the successful Soviet breakout on 12 January 1945.

== Historical photos ==
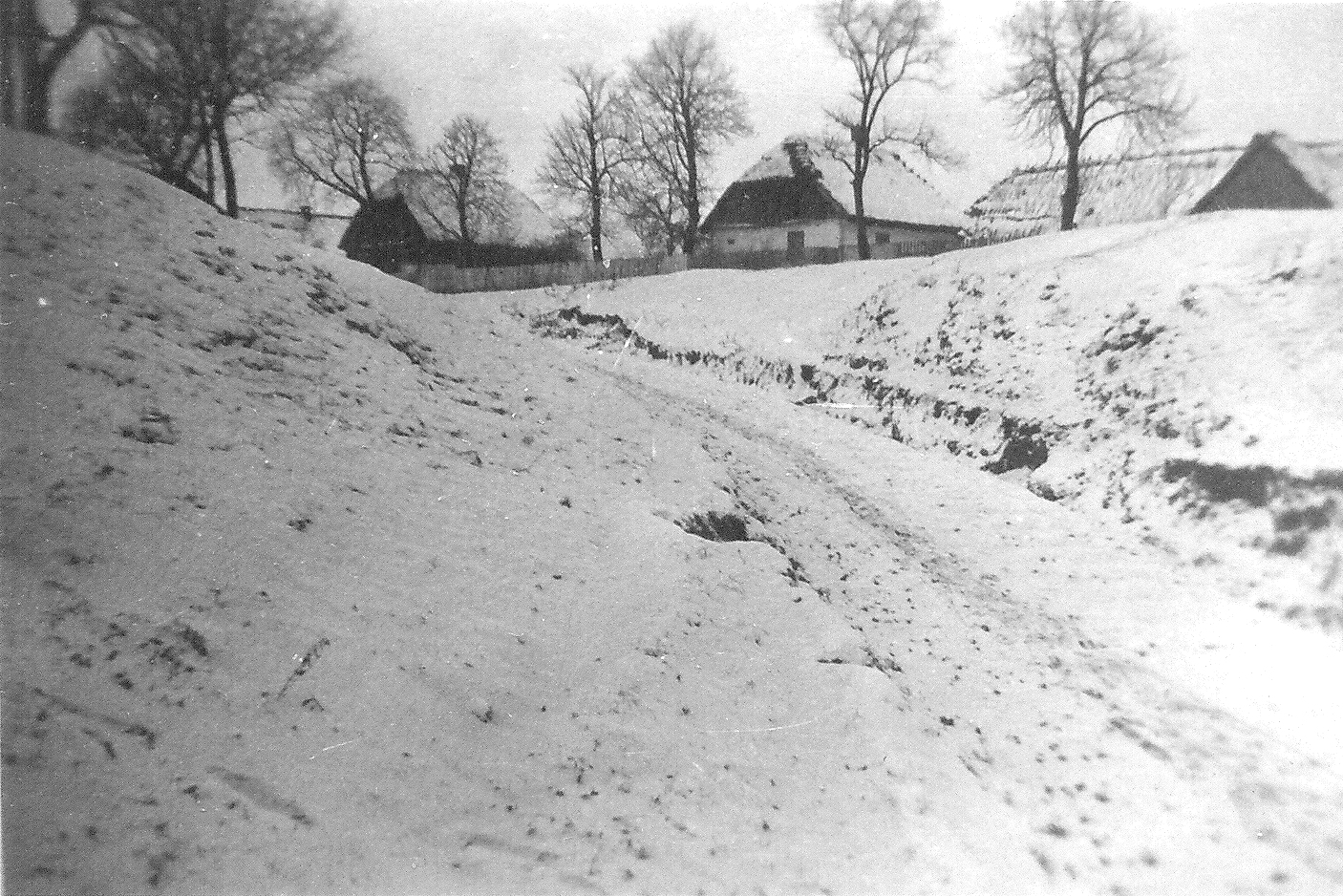
Houses in Pilica, c.1939

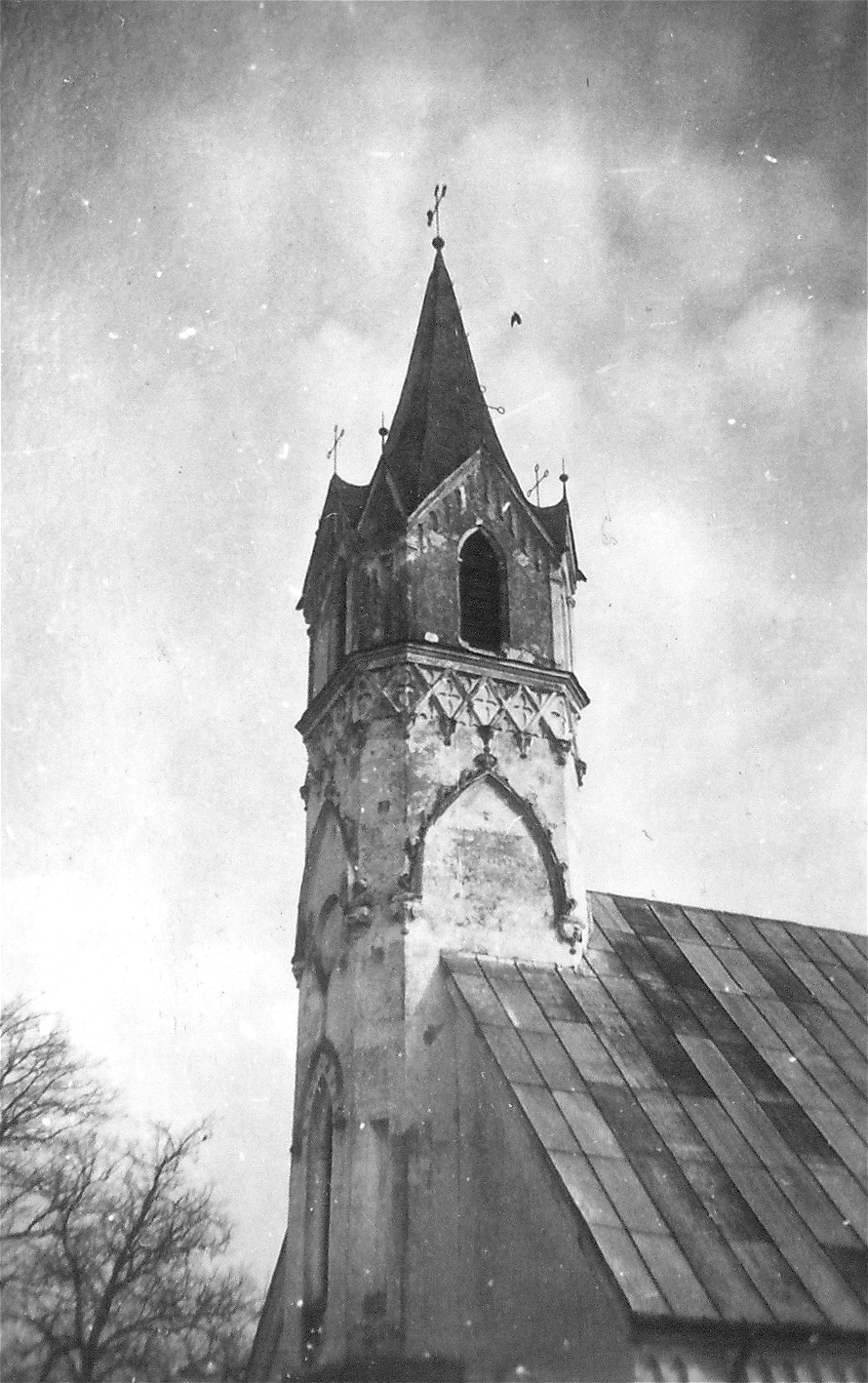
Spire of Evangelical Lutheran church (Kościół Ewangelicko-Augsburski) in Pilica, c.1939

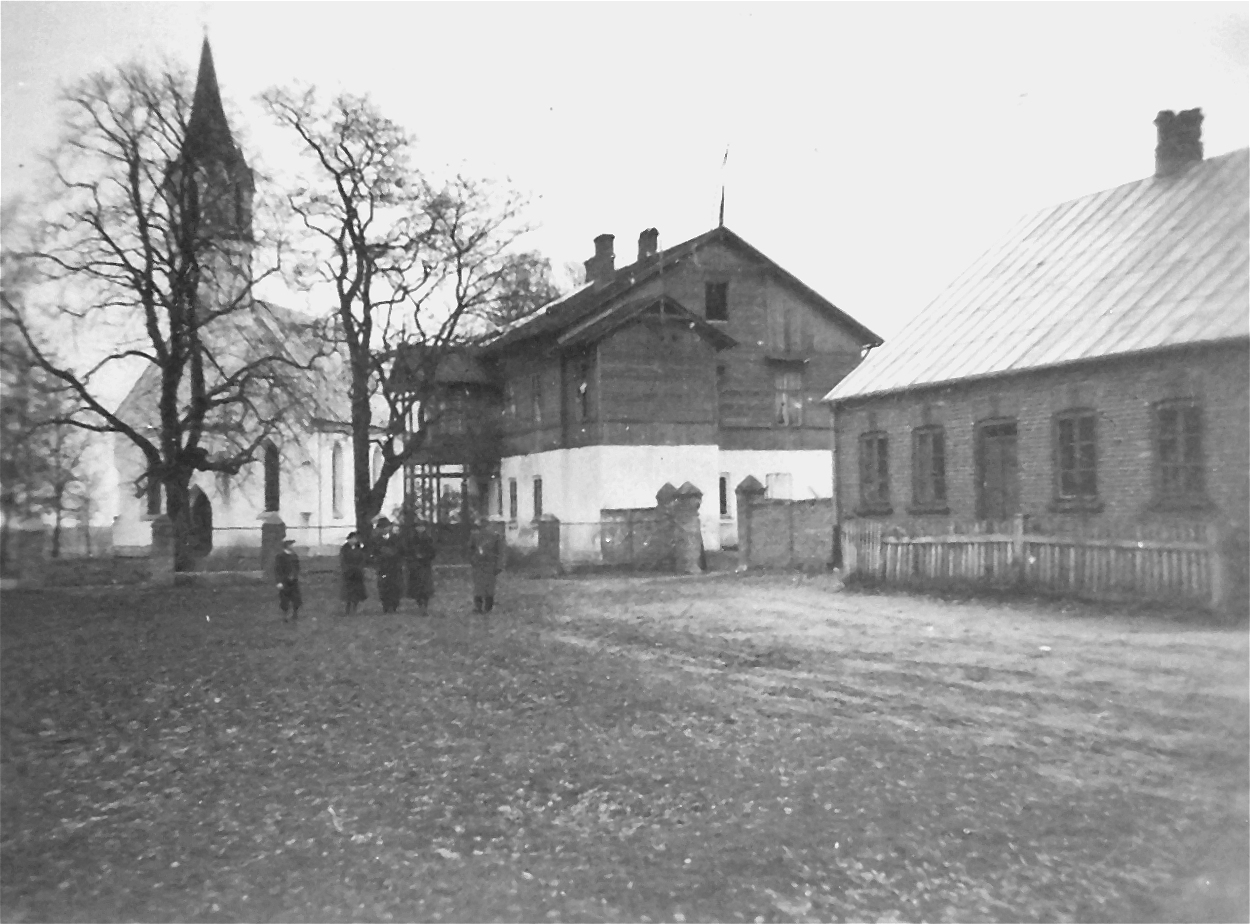
Evangelical Lutheran church and manse in Pilica, c.1939
