= Paulin =

Paulin may refer to:

- Paulin (name), a given name and surname
- Paulin, Dordogne, a commune in Aquitaine, France
- Paulin, Masovian Voivodeship, a settlement in Poland

== See also ==
- Paulins Kill, a river in New Jersey, United States
- Saint-Paulin, Quebec, a municipality in Canada
- Saint-Paulin cheese, a French cheese
