= Zygmunt Kalinowski =

Polish footballer (born 1949)

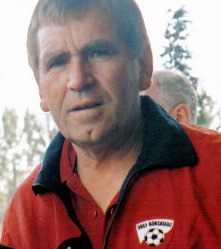
- Kalinowski in 2007

Personal information
- Date of birth: 2 May 1949 (age 77)
- Place of birth: Laski, Poland
- Height: 1.82 m (6 ft 0 in)
- Position: Goalkeeper

Youth career
- 1964–1968: Pilica Warka

Senior career*
Years	Team	Apps	(Gls)
1968–1970	Legia Warsaw	3	(0)
1971–1979	Śląsk Wrocław	168	(0)
1979–1981	Motor Lublin	13	(0)
1981–1982	Polonia Sydney		
1982–1986	Motor Lublin	81	(0)
1987–1988	Stal Kraśnik		
1988	North York Rockets	26	(0)
1992	Ruch Ryki		
1992–1996	Prywaciarz Tomaszów Lubelski		

International career
1973–1974	Poland	4	(0)
Medal record
Men's football
Representing Poland
FIFA World Cup
Third place	1974 West Germany
- * Club domestic league appearances and goals

Zygmunt Kalinowski (born 2 May 1949) is a Polish former professional footballer who played as a goalkeeper.

Among the clubs he played for included Legia Warsaw, Śląsk Wrocław and Motor Lublin. He earned 4 caps for the Poland national football team, and was a reserve goalkeeper in the 1974 FIFA World Cup, where Poland finished third.

== Honours ==
Śląsk Wrocław

- Ekstraklasa: 1976–77
- Polish Cup: 1975–76

Poland

- FIFA World Cup third place: 1974
