= Jaktorów-Osada =

Settlement in Poland

- Settlement
- Location within Poland
- Coordinates: 52°06′36″N 20°32′18″E
- Country: Poland
- Voivodeship: Masovian
- County: Grodzisk
- Gmina: Jaktorów

Jaktorów-Osada [jakˈtɔruf ɔˈsada] is a settlement in the administrative district of Gmina Jaktorów, within Grodzisk County, Masovian Voivodeship, in east-central Poland.
