= Nowa Wieś, Grójec County =

Nowa Wieś
- Village
- The village's former manor house

- Location within Poland
- Coordinates: 51°48′N 21°4′E
- Country: Poland
- Voivodeship: Masovian
- County: Grójec
- Gmina: Warka

Nowa Wieś [ˈnɔva ˈvjɛɕ] is a village in the administrative district of Gmina Warka, within Grójec County, Masovian Voivodeship, in east-central Poland.
