= Gmina Warka =

Gmina Warka Warka Commune
- Gmina
- Coat of arms
- Interactive map of Gmina Warka
- Coordinates (Warka): 51°47′N 21°12′E
- Country: Poland
- Voivodeship: Masovian
- County: Grójec
- Seat: Warka

Area
  - Total: 201.14 km^{2} (77.66 sq mi)

Population (2006)
  - Total: 18,896
  - Density: 93.945/km^{2} (243.32/sq mi)
  - Urban: 11,028
  - Rural: 7,868
- Website: http://www.warka.pl

Gmina Warka is an urban-rural gmina (administrative district) in Grójec County, Masovian Voivodeship, in east-central Poland. Its seat is the town of Warka, which lies approximately 25 kilometres (16 mi) east of Grójec and 50 km (31 mi) south of Warsaw.

The gmina covers an area of 201.14 square kilometres (77.7 sq mi), and as of 2006 its total population is 18,896 (of which the population of Warka amounts to 11,028, and the population of the rural part of the gmina is 7,868).

== Villages ==
Apart from the town of Warka, Gmina Warka contains the villages and settlements of Bończa, Borowe, Branków, Brzezinki, Budy Michałowskie, Budy Opożdżewskie, Dębnowola, Gąski, Gośniewice, Grażyna, Grzegorzewice, Gucin, Hornigi, Kalina, Kazimierków, Klonowa Wola, Konary, Krześniaków, Laski, Lechanice, Magierowa Wola, Michalczew, Michałów Dolny, Michałów Górny, Michałów-Parcele, Murowanka, Niwy Ostrołęckie, Nowa Ostrołęka, Nowa Wieś, Nowe Biskupice, Nowe Grzegorzewice, Opożdżew, Oskardów, Ostrołęka, Ostrówek, Palczew, Palczew-Parcela, Paulin, Piaseczno, Pilica, Podgórzyce, Prusy, Przylot, Stara Warka, Stare Biskupice, Wichradz, Wola Palczewska, Wrociszew and Zastruże.

== Neighbouring gminas ==
Gmina Warka is bordered by the gminas of Białobrzegi, Chynów, Góra Kalwaria, Grabów nad Pilicą, Jasieniec, Magnuszew, Promna, Sobienie-Jeziory, Stromiec and Wilga.
