= Lechanice =

- Village
- Location within Poland
- Coordinates: 51°44′N 21°6′E
- Country: Poland
- Voivodeship: Masovian
- County: Grójec
- Gmina: Warka
- Population: 150

Lechanice [lɛxaˈnit͡sɛ] is a village in the administrative district of Gmina Warka, within Grójec County, Masovian Voivodeship, in east-central Poland.
