= Bieganów, Masovian Voivodeship =

Bieganów
- Village
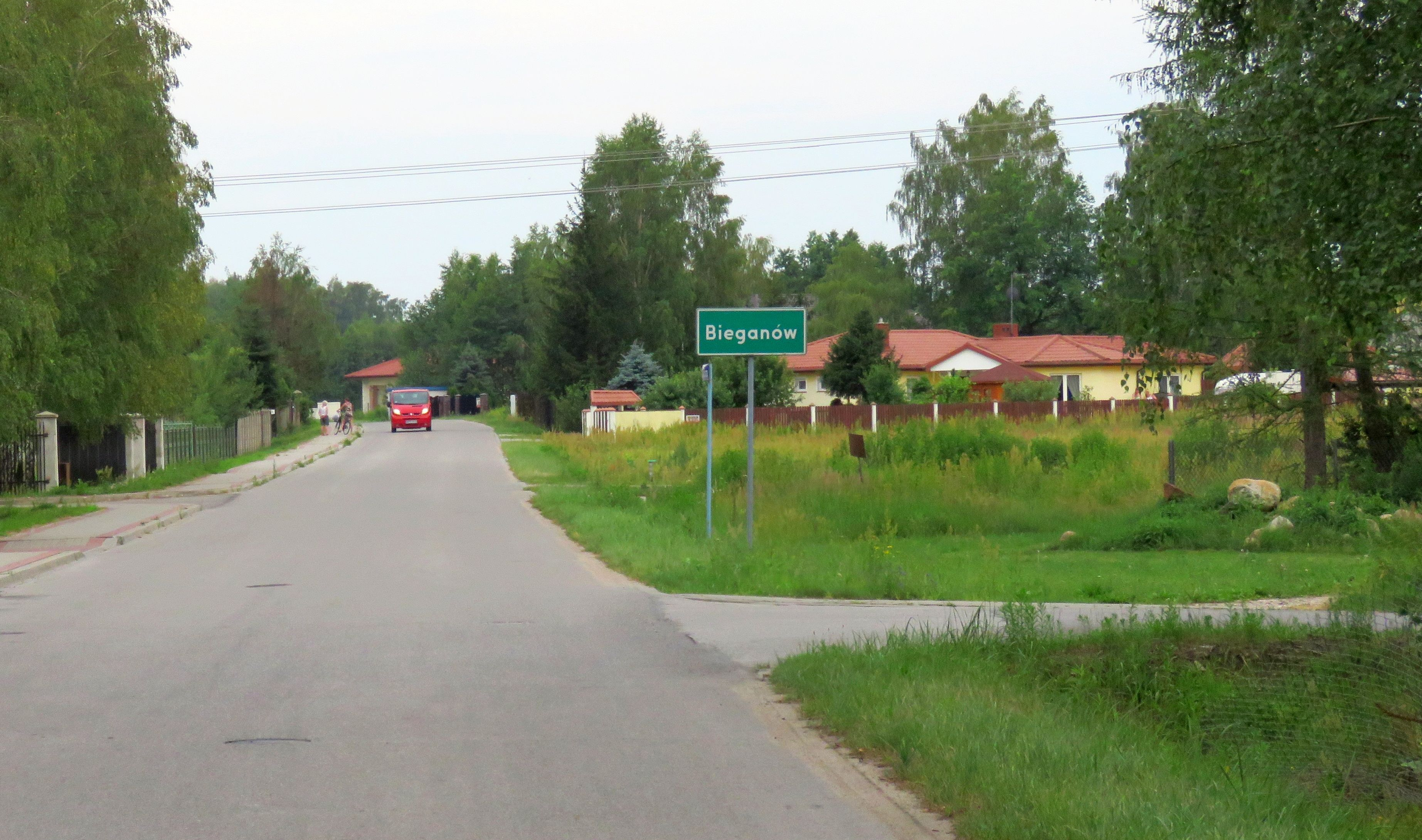

- Location within Poland
- Coordinates: 52°2′42″N 20°28′50″E
- Country: Poland
- Voivodeship: Masovian
- County: Grodzisk
- Gmina: Jaktorów
- Time zone: UTC+1 (CET)
  - Summer (DST): UTC+2 (CEST)

Bieganów [bjɛˈɡanuf] is a village in the administrative district of Gmina Jaktorów, within Grodzisk County, Masovian Voivodeship, in central Poland.

Nine Polish citizens were murdered by Nazi Germany in the village during World War II.
