= Ostrołęka, Grójec County =

Ostrołęka
- Village
- Location within Poland
- Coordinates: 51°50′1″N 21°15′33″E
- Country: Poland
- Voivodeship: Masovian
- County: Grójec
- Gmina: Warka
- Population: 120

Ostrołęka [ɔstrɔˈwɛŋka] is a village in the administrative district of Gmina Warka, within Grójec County, Masovian Voivodeship, in east-central Poland.
