= Oskardów =

- Settlement
- Location within Poland
- Coordinates: 51°45′02″N 21°05′26″E
- Country: Poland
- Voivodeship: Masovian
- County: Grójec
- Gmina: Warka

Oskardów [ɔsˈkarduf] is a settlement in the administrative district of Gmina Warka, within Grójec County, Masovian Voivodeship, in east-central Poland.
