= Budy-Grzybek =

- Village
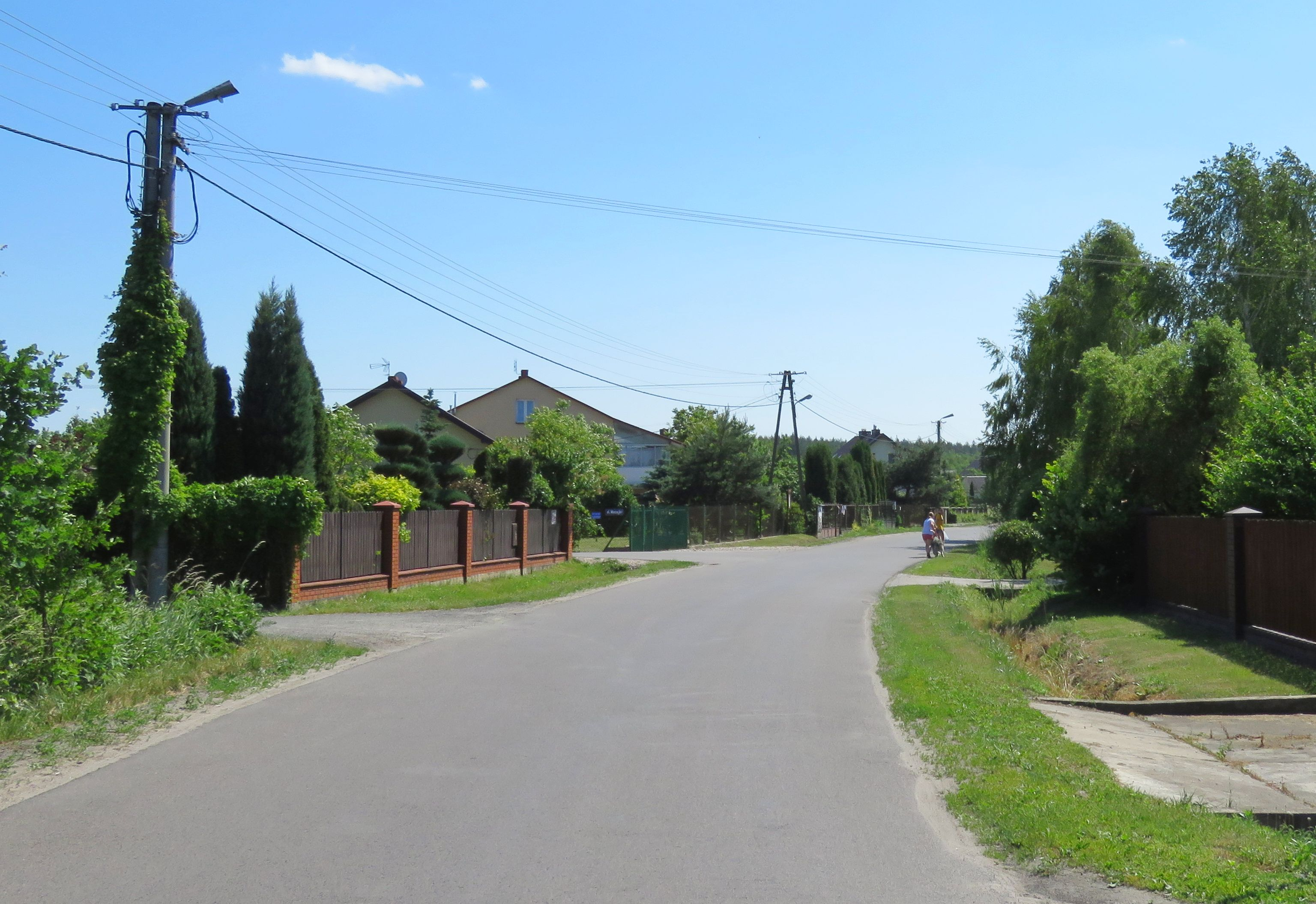

- Location within Poland
- Coordinates: 52°4′35″N 20°32′54″E
- Country: Poland
- Voivodeship: Masovian
- County: Grodzisk
- Gmina: Jaktorów
- Population: 700

Budy-Grzybek [ˈbudɨ ˈɡʐɨbɛk] is a village in the administrative district of Gmina Jaktorów, within Grodzisk County, Masovian Voivodeship, in east-central Poland.
