= Klonowa Wola =

- Village
- Location within Poland
- Coordinates: 51°50′N 21°13′E
- Country: Poland
- Voivodeship: Masovian
- County: Grójec
- Gmina: Warka
- Population: 150

Klonowa Wola [klɔˈnɔva ˈvɔla] is a village in the administrative district of Gmina Warka, within Grójec County, Masovian Voivodeship, in east-central Poland.
