= Gmina Jaktorów =

Gmina Jaktorów Jaktorów Commune
- Gmina
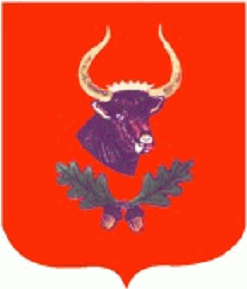
- Coat of arms
- Interactive map of Gmina Jaktorów
- Coordinates (Jaktorów): 52°5′N 20°31′E
- Country: Poland
- Voivodeship: Masovian
- County: Grodzisk
- Seat: Jaktorów

Area
  - Total: 55.24 km^{2} (21.33 sq mi)

Population (2006)
  - Total: 10,090
  - Density: 182.7/km^{2} (473.1/sq mi)
- Website: http://www.jaktorow.pl/

Gmina Jaktorów is a rural gmina (administrative district) in Grodzisk County, Masovian Voivodeship, in east-central Poland. Its seat is the village of Jaktorów, which lies approximately 8 kilometres (5 mi) west of Grodzisk Mazowiecki and 37 km (23 mi) south-west of Warsaw.

The gmina covers an area of 55.24 square kilometres (21.3 sq mi), and as of 2006 its total population is 10,090.

== Villages ==
Gmina Jaktorów contains the villages and settlements of Bieganów, Budy Michałowskie, Budy Zosine, Budy-Grzybek, Chylice, Chylice-Kolonia, Chylice-Osada, Grabnik, Grądy, Henryszew, Jaktorów, Jaktorów-Kolonia, Jaktorów-Osada, Kołaczek, Mariampol, Maruna, Międzyborów, Sade Budy and Stare Budy.

== Neighbouring gminas ==
Gmina Jaktorów is bordered by the town of Żyrardów and by the gminas of Baranów, Grodzisk Mazowiecki, Radziejowice and Wiskitki.
