= Paulin (name) =

Paulin is a French masculine given name and surname.

== People with the surname Paulin ==
- Donald Paulin, American businessman and politician
- Georges Paulin (1902–42), French car designer and wartime resistance fighter
- Scott Paulin (born 1950), American actor and television director
- Tom Paulin (born 1949), Northern Irish poet and critic
- Viveca Paulin (born 1969), Swedish actress

== People with the given name Paulin ==
- Paulin Bordeleau (born 1953), Canadian ice hockey player
- Paulin Dhëmbi (born 1979), Albanian footballer
- Paulin Freitas (1909–1989), Togolese politician
- Jean-Baptiste Paulin Guérin (1783–1855), French painter
- Paulin J. Hountondji (born 1942), Beninese politician
- Paulin Joachim (1931–2012), Beninese journalist
- Paulin Tokala Kombe (born 1977), Congolese footballer
- Paulin Lemaire (1882-?), French gymnast
- Paulin Martin (1840–1890), French Biblical scholar
- Paulin de Milan, aka Paulinus the Deacon, 5th century notary
- Paulin Obame-Nguema (1934–2023), former Prime Minister of Gabon
- Alexis Paulin Paris (1800–1881), French scholar
- Paulin Pomodimo (born 1954), Archbishop in the Central African Republic
- Paulin Soumanou Vieyra (1925–1987), Benin/Senegal film director and historian
- Paulin Voavy (born 1987), Malagasy footballer

== See also ==
- Paulin (disambiguation)
