= Branków =

- Village
- Location within Poland
- Coordinates: 51°42′N 21°1′E
- Country: Poland
- Voivodeship: Masovian
- County: Grójec
- Gmina: Warka

Population
  - Total: 260
- Time zone: UTC+1 (CET)
  - Summer (DST): UTC+2 (CEST)

Branków [ˈbrankuf] is a village in the administrative district of Gmina Warka, within Grójec County, Masovian Voivodeship, in south-central Poland.

Five Polish citizens were murdered by Nazi Germany in the village during World War II.
