= Nowa Ostrołęka =

Village in Gmina Warka, Poland

- Village
- Location within Poland
- Coordinates: 51°49′45″N 21°14′30″E
- Country: Poland
- Voivodeship: Masovian
- County: Grójec
- Gmina: Warka
- Time zone: UTC+1 (CET)
  - Summer (DST): UTC+2 (CEST)

Nowa Ostrołęka [ˈnɔva ɔstrɔˈwɛŋka] is a village in the administrative district of Gmina Warka, within Grójec County, Masovian Voivodeship, in east-central Poland.

Five Polish citizens were murdered by Nazi Germany in the village during World War II.
