= Grzegorzewice, Grójec County =

Grzegorzewice
- Village
- Location within Poland
- Coordinates: 51°45′N 21°7′E
- Country: Poland
- Voivodeship: Masovian
- County: Grójec
- Gmina: Warka
- Population: 120

Grzegorzewice [ɡʐɛɡɔʐɛˈvit͡sɛ] is a village in the administrative district of Gmina Warka, within Grójec County, Masovian Voivodeship, in east-central Poland. In 2007, the adjoining village of Nowe Grzegorzewice was incoproated into Grzegorzewice.
