= Chylice-Kolonia =

- Village
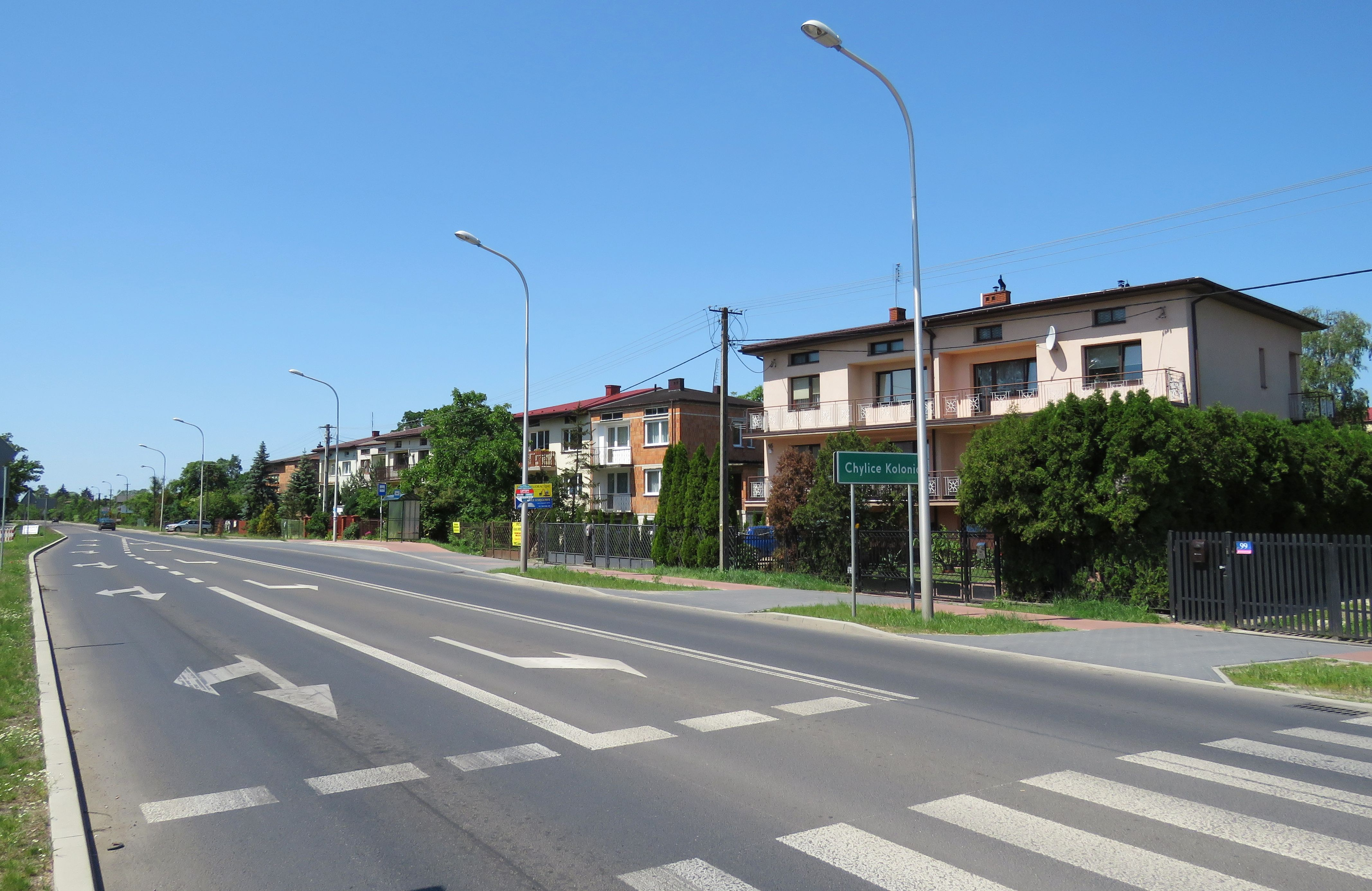

- Location within Poland
- Coordinates: 52°05′23″N 20°33′12″E
- Country: Poland
- Voivodeship: Masovian
- County: Grodzisk
- Gmina: Jaktorów
- Population: 1,300

Chylice-Kolonia [xɨˈlit͡sɛ kɔˈlɔɲa] is a village in the administrative district of Gmina Jaktorów, within Grodzisk County, Masovian Voivodeship, in east-central Poland.
