= Chylice-Osada =

- Settlement
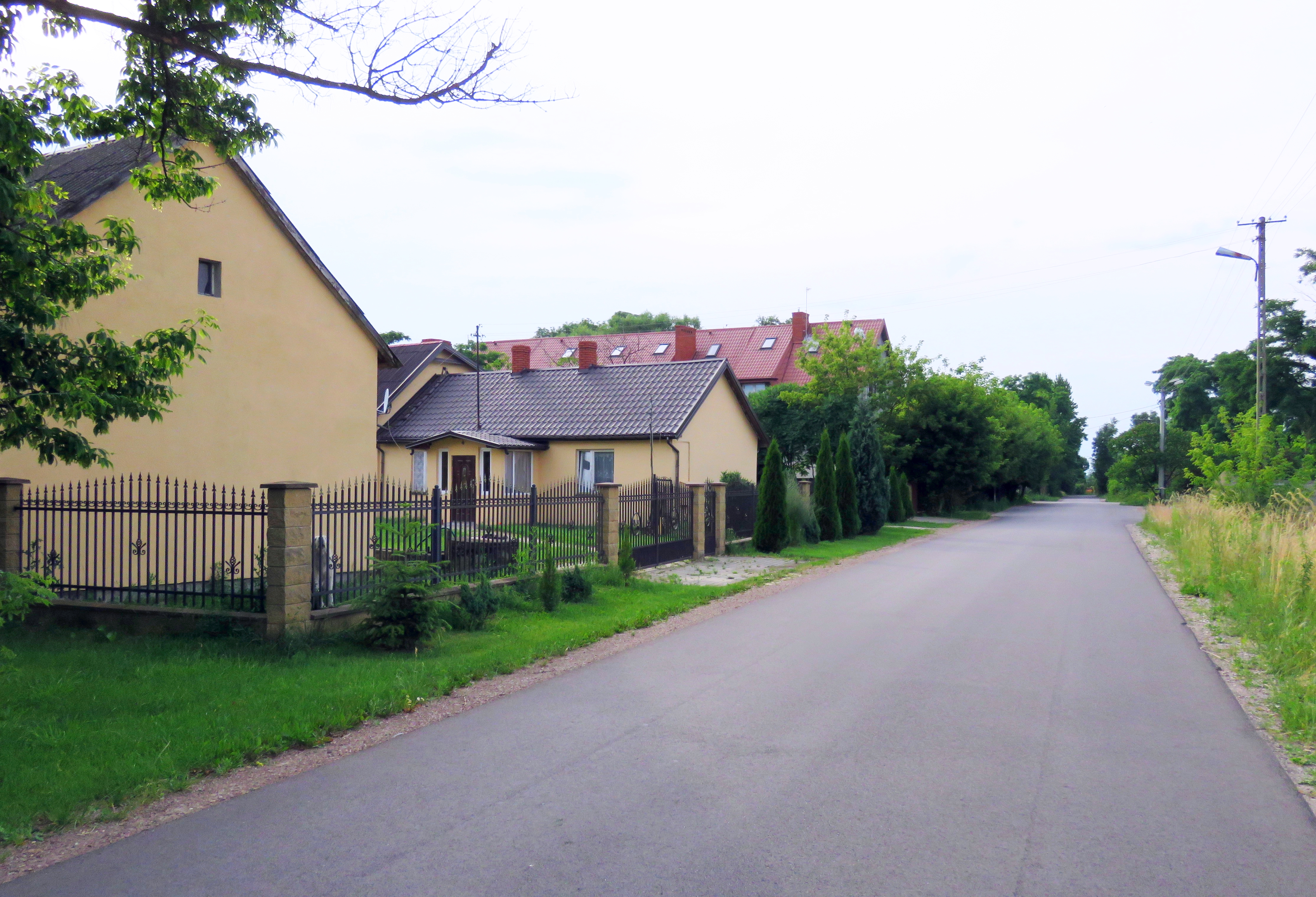
- Group of houses in Chylice-Osada

- Location within Poland
- Coordinates: 52°06′27″N 20°33′17″E
- Country: Poland
- Voivodeship: Masovian
- County: Grodzisk
- Gmina: Jaktorów

Chylice-Osada [xɨˈlit͡sɛ ɔˈsada] is a settlement in the administrative district of Gmina Jaktorów, within Grodzisk County, Masovian Voivodeship, in east-central Poland.
