= Opożdżew =

- Village
- Location within Poland
- Coordinates: 51°45′N 21°5′E
- Country: Poland
- Voivodeship: Masovian
- County: Grójec
- Gmina: Warka
- Population: 200

Opożdżew [ɔˈpɔʐd͡ʐɛf] is a village in the administrative district of Gmina Warka, within Grójec County, Masovian Voivodeship, in east-central Poland.
