= Mariampol, Gmina Jaktorów =

Mariampol
- Village
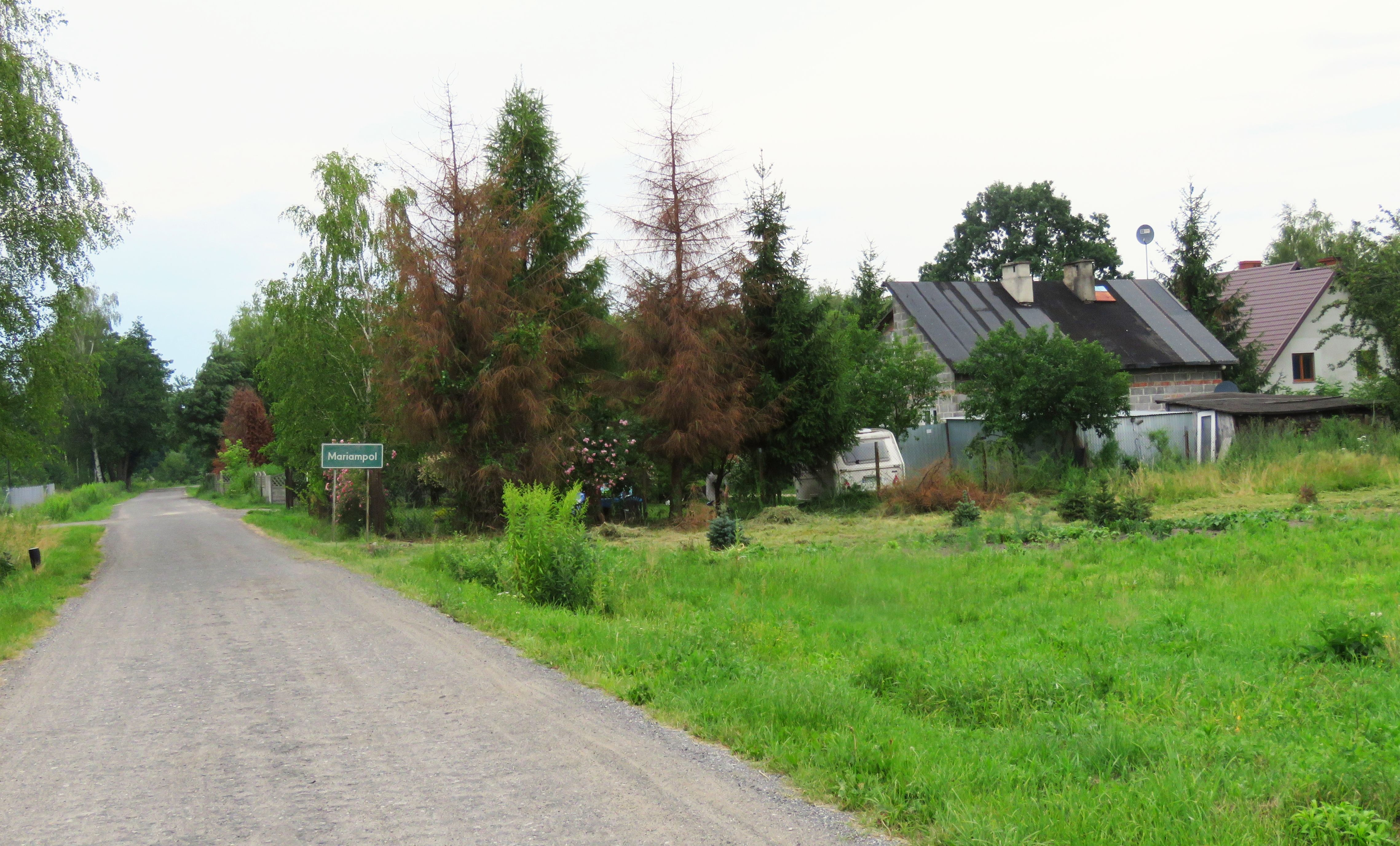

- Location within Poland
- Coordinates: 52°02′31″N 20°28′07″E
- Country: Poland
- Voivodeship: Masovian
- County: Grodzisk
- Gmina: Jaktorów

Mariampol [maˈrjampɔl] is a village in the administrative district of Gmina Jaktorów, within Grodzisk County, Masovian Voivodeship, in east-central Poland.
