= Przylot =

- Village
- Location within Poland
- Coordinates: 51°51′6″N 21°15′3″E
- Country: Poland
- Voivodeship: Masovian
- County: Grójec
- Gmina: Warka
- Population: 150

Przylot [ˈpʂɨlɔt] is a village in the administrative district of Gmina Warka, within Grójec County, Masovian Voivodeship, in east-central Poland.
