= Niwy Ostrołęckie =

- Village
- Location within Poland
- Coordinates: 51°49′N 21°15′E
- Country: Poland
- Voivodeship: Masovian
- County: Grójec
- Gmina: Warka
- Population: 100

Niwy Ostrołęckie [ˈnivɨ ɔstrɔˈwɛnt͡skʲɛ] is a village in the administrative district of Gmina Warka, within Grójec County, Masovian Voivodeship, in east-central Poland.
