= Sade Budy =

- Village
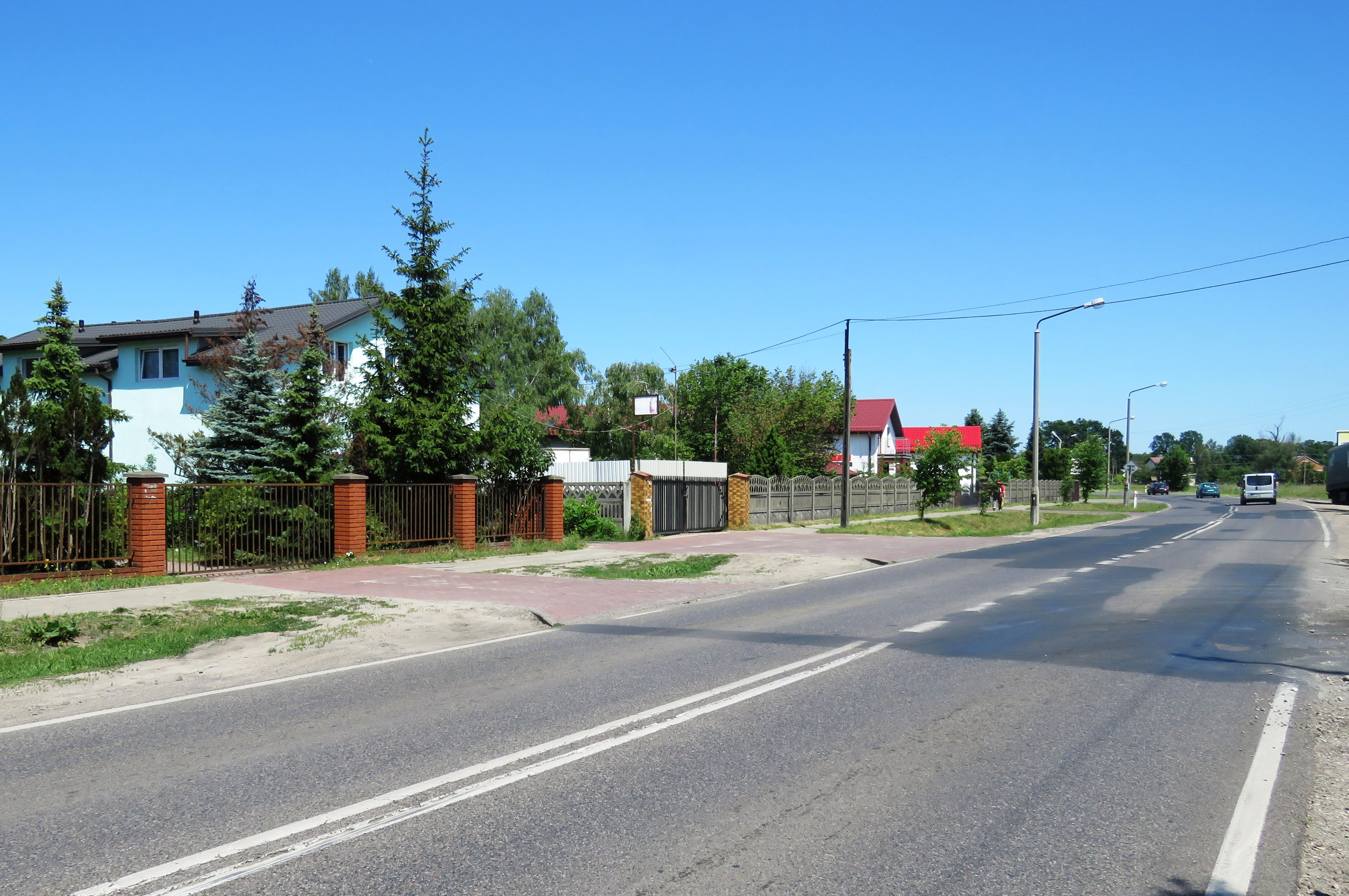

- Location within Poland
- Coordinates: 52°03′33″N 20°29′29″E
- Country: Poland
- Voivodeship: Masovian
- County: Grodzisk
- Gmina: Jaktorów
- Population: 940

Sade Budy [ˈsadɛ ˈbudɨ] is a village in the administrative district of Gmina Jaktorów, within Grodzisk County, Masovian Voivodeship, in east-central Poland.
