= Battle of Warka =

Battle between Poland–Lithuania and Sweden with a Polish victory

Coordinates: 51°47′00″N 21°12′00″E

- Part of the Second Northern War and The Deluge
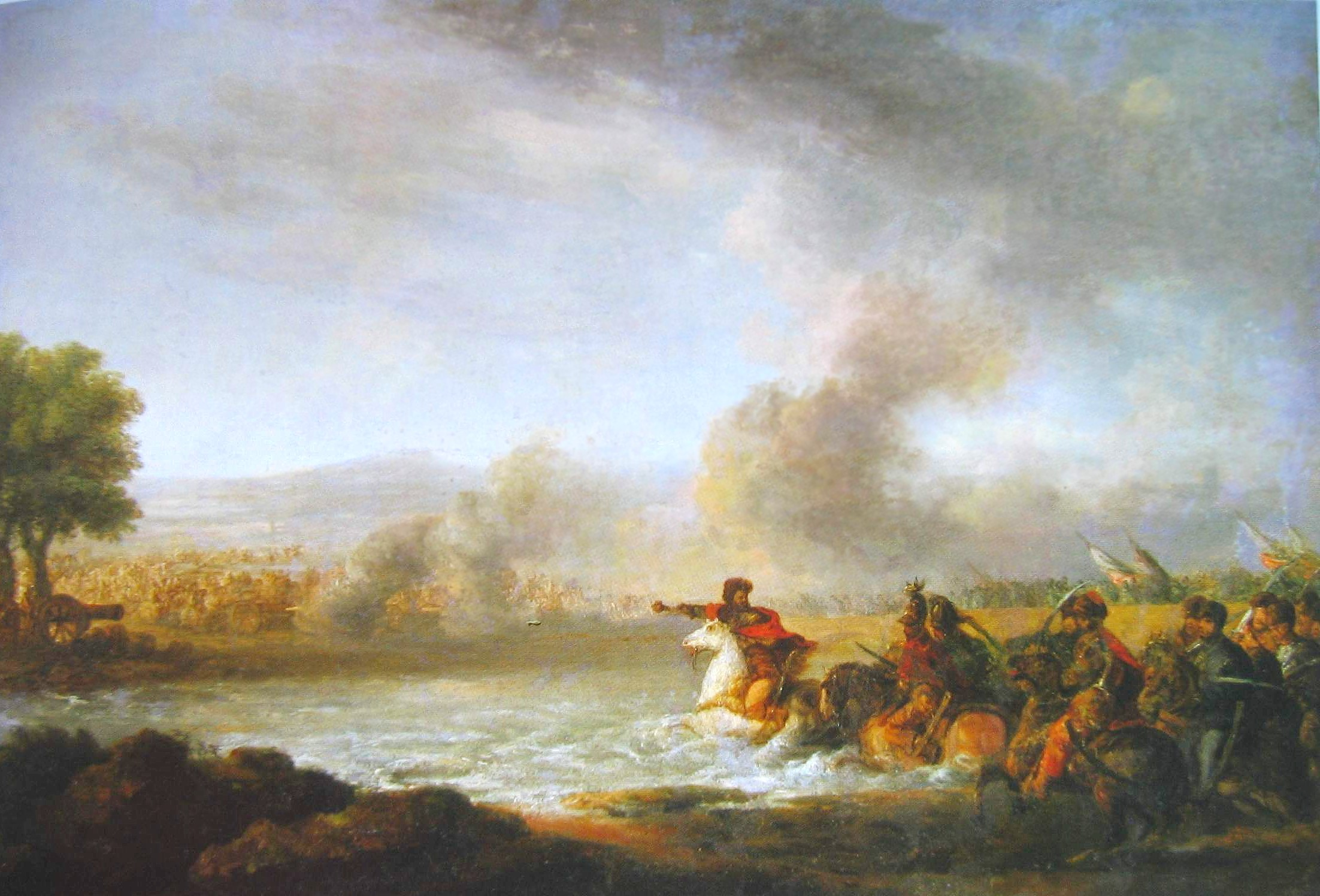
- Battle of Warka 1656 by Franciszek Smuglewicz (1745-1807), National Museum in Wrocław
Date	April 7, 1656
Location	Warka
Result	Polish-Lithuanian victory

Belligerents
Swedish Empire	Polish–Lithuanian Commonwealth

Commanders and leaders
(Swedish Empire) Frederick VI (Swedish Empire) Ritter †	(Polish–Lithuanian Commonwealth) Stefan Czarniecki (Polish–Lithuanian Commonwealth) Jerzy Sebastian Lubomirski

Strength
2,200–2,500	Around 6,000–7,500

Casualties and losses
400 killed and captured 2,000 killed and wounded 200 captured	100 killed 100 wounded

The Battle of Warka occurred on April 7, 1656 between the forces of the Polish–Lithuanian Commonwealth, commanded by Stefan Czarniecki, and the forces of the Swedish Empire, commanded by Frederick VI, Margrave of Baden-Durlach. Lasting about two hours, the battle ended in a Polish victory.

It was the first Polish success on the open field since the Swedish invasion of Poland in the early summer of 1655, during the Swedish Deluge.

== Background ==
After the Battle of Jaroslaw, which took place on March 15, 1656, Swedish forces under king Charles X Gustav found themselves in a difficult situation. They needed reinforcements, so on March 16, the king ordered his brother, Adolph John, to send the army of Frederick VI, Margrave of Baden-Durlach, which was stationed in Warsaw.

In the second half of March 1656, the margrave left Warsaw, with between 2,200 and 2,500 reiters and dragoons. His mission was to relieve the main Swedish army, together with the king himself, which was trapped and surrounded by Poles and Lithuanians in the confluence of the Vistula and San rivers. The margrave and his soldiers had to cross the dense Kozienice Wilderness, where Swedish units were constantly attacked by Polish guerillas. After a few days, Frederick VI received a message from Charles Gustav, ordering him to return to Warsaw. The Swedish king realized that main Polish forces, which had trapped him in the area of Gorzyce, headed northwards, to face Frederick. Polish hetmans Jerzy Lubomirski and Stefan Czarniecki were no longer in the area, which gave Charles Gustav a chance to escape the trap.

Frederick VI obeyed royal order, and began a retreat, via Kozienice and Warka. The Polish forces under Czarniecki and Lubomirski that chased him had to cover the distance of some 80 kilometers, which was difficult in the conditions of early spring, when roads were flooded by melting snow. The forces of Frederick VI could have escaped the Poles, but the margrave made a grave mistake, when he decided to wait for a column of Swedish soldiers together with heavy wagons, which marched slowly to Warka from Radom. When The Polish forces reached Zwolen, after a quick march from Sandomierz, Frederick’s force was still located south of the Pilica river.

== Battle ==
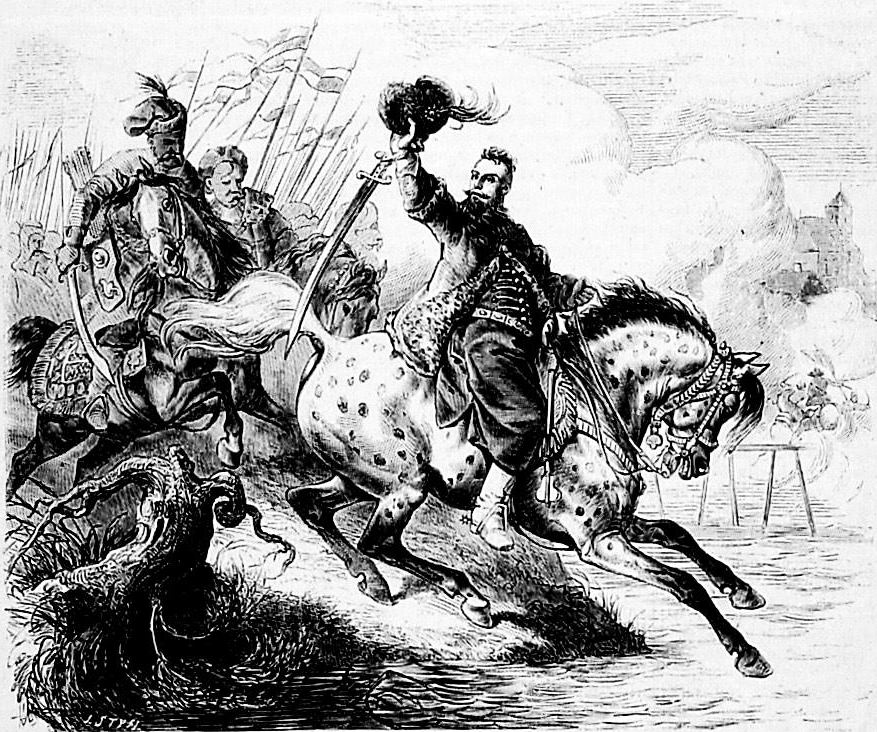
Battle of Warka, Juliusz Kossak, 1862

After both Swedish groups had joined, they crossed the Pilica, which lasted a whole night. At the same time, Polish forces under Lubomirski caught the Swedish rearguard. The skirmish, which took place near Kozienice, ended with complete destruction of the Swedes. The survivors, who reached Frederick VI, told him about the danger, but the margrave waited with destruction of the bridge until the morning of April 7.

After leaving the rearguard along the river, the Swedes formed a 4-kilometer long column, and began marching towards Warsaw. When The Polish forces arrived, the column stretched from Piaseczno in the north to Warka in the south. Frederick VI did not feel threatened, as the Pilica was very wide after snowmelt, and there was no bridge available for The Polish cavalry. The Poles, however, quickly found a ford, crossing the river near the village of Winiary, where they immediately attacked the Swedish reiters located. The Polish forces were then divided into three groups. One of the groups, under Czarniecki, attacked the Swedes guarding the partly destroyed bridge. After capturing the bridge, Polish engineers rebuilt it, which allowed three regiments to cross the Pilica. In the meantime, Lubomirski caught up with lieutenant colonel Ritter's regiment forming the Swedish rearguard, defeating it and killing its commander.

Frederick VI, whose forces shrank to between 2,200 and 2,500, ordered some units to guard the wagons, while the remaining regiments took positions at the edge of a forest, waiting for the attacking Poles with loaded muskets. Since Swedish troops stood in front of the forest, it was impossible for the Poles to encircle them, and a frontal attack was the only solution.

First to attack was Lubmirski’s cavalry, but it was twice stopped by Swedish firepower. Soon, Lubomirski was reinforced by Czarniecki with three regiments. Altogether, the Poles had 8,000 soldiers, divided into ten regiments, but some 6,000 participated in the main fighting, as the remaining ones were busy chasing the retreating Swedes or looting the wagons.

Swedish defense was broken in the third attack, carried out by Polish hussars. Survivors fled to the forest, trying to organize defensive positions there. Local residents then set the grass and bushes on fire, which forced the Swedes to return to the open field. The battle then turned into a slaughter; those reiters and dragoons that survived were mercilessly murdered by the peasants. A Swedish regiment tried to escape to a forest near the village of Magierowa Wola, but was destroyed by the Polish hussarss of Zamoyski. Other Polish units awaited fleeing Swedes near Chynow. Frederick himself escaped to Czersk, where he organized defence in the local castle. Polish units, who chased him, did not try to capture the castle, as they lacked infantry and artillery.

Polish cavalry had very little time, as all units had to quickly return to the south, to prevent the Swedish army from escaping. In the meantime, however, Charles Gustav, in a daring operation, managed to evade second-rate forces, which encircled him, and crossed the San.

== Aftermath ==
Swedish losses amounted to some 400 killed and captured, while Poles lost 100 killed and 100 wounded, plus a great number of trained horses, killed by Swedish muskets. Polish forces captured a number of wagons (about 200) with looted properties, and food, which was especially important in the destroyed, starving country.

The victory of Warka had a symbolic meaning for Poland–Lithuania. The Polish Crown army, which had lost its best soldiers in the Battle of Batoh (1652), was based on young, inexperienced recruits, who had lost several battles with the Swedish Empire in the previous months. The Battle of Warka was the first Polish victory in an open field.
