= Prusy, Grójec County =

Prusy
- Village
- Location within Poland
- Coordinates: 51°49′N 21°10′E
- Country: Poland
- Voivodeship: Masovian
- County: Grójec
- Gmina: Warka
- Population: 90

Prusy [ˈprusɨ] is a village in the administrative district of Gmina Warka, within Grójec County, Masovian Voivodeship, in east-central Poland.
