= Podgórzyce, Masovian Voivodeship =

Podgórzyce
- Village
- Location within Poland
- Coordinates: 51°52′48″N 21°14′25″E
- Country: Poland
- Voivodeship: Masovian
- County: Grójec
- Gmina: Warka
- Population: 160

Podgórzyce [pɔdɡuˈʐɨt͡sɛ] is a village in the administrative district of Gmina Warka, within Grójec County, Masovian Voivodeship in east-central Poland.
