= Nowe Grzegorzewice =

- Former village
- Location within Poland
- Coordinates: 51°45′44″N 21°08′15″E
- Country: Poland
- Voivodeship: Masovian
- County: Grójec
- Gmina: Warka

Nowe Grzegorzewice [ˈnɔvɛ ɡʐɛɡɔʐɛˈvit͡sɛ] was a village in Masovia, Poland. In 2007 it was abolished and merged with the village of Grzegorzewice.
