= Stare Budy, Gmina Jaktorów =

Stare Budy
- Village
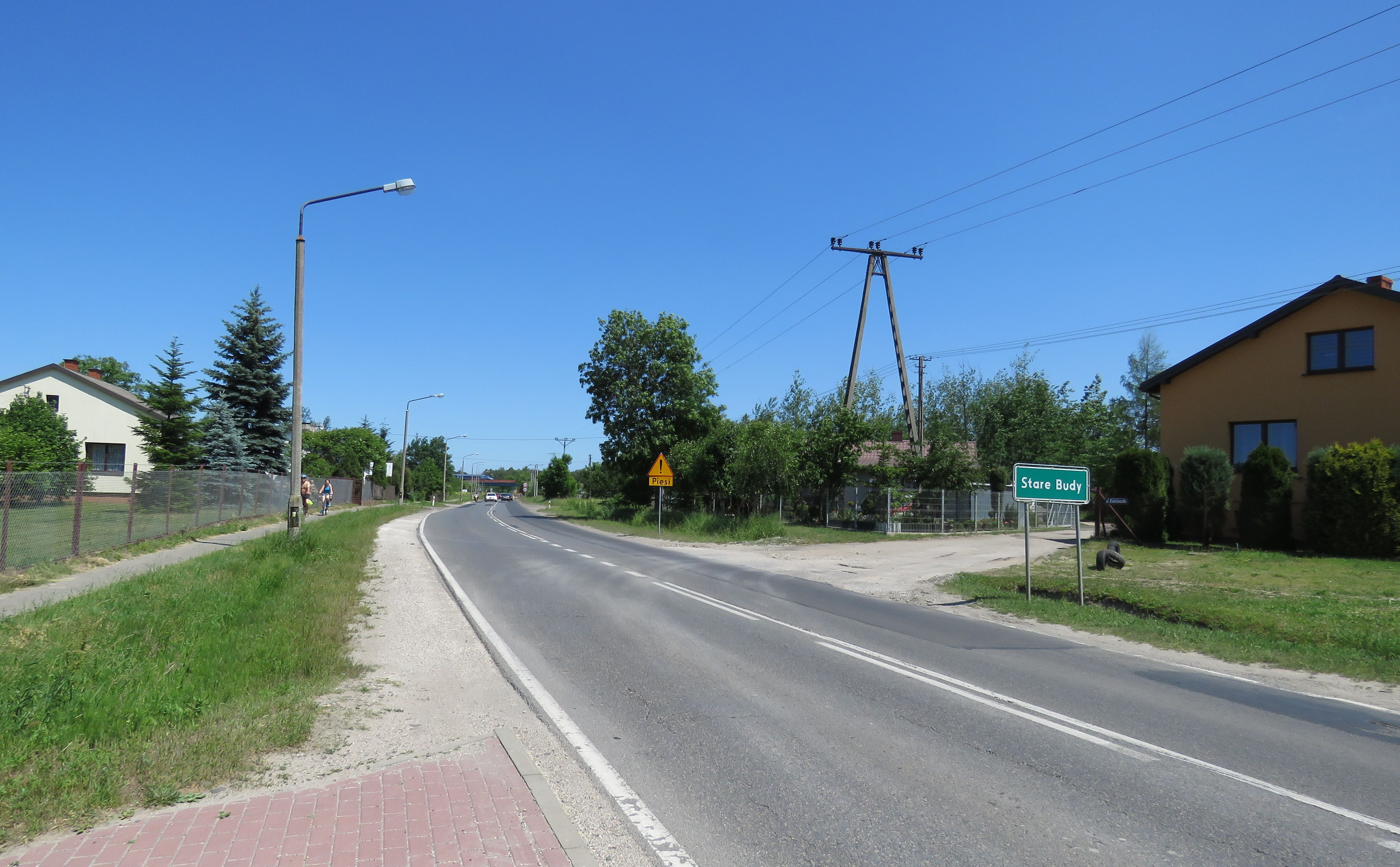

- Location within Poland
- Coordinates: 52°19′01″N 20°08′39″E
- Country: Poland
- Voivodeship: Masovian
- County: Grodzisk
- Gmina: Jaktorów
- Population: 700

Stare Budy [ˈstarɛ ˈbudɨ] is a village in the administrative district of Gmina Jaktorów, within Grodzisk County, Masovian Voivodeship, in east-central Poland.
