= Konary, Grójec County =

Konary
- Village
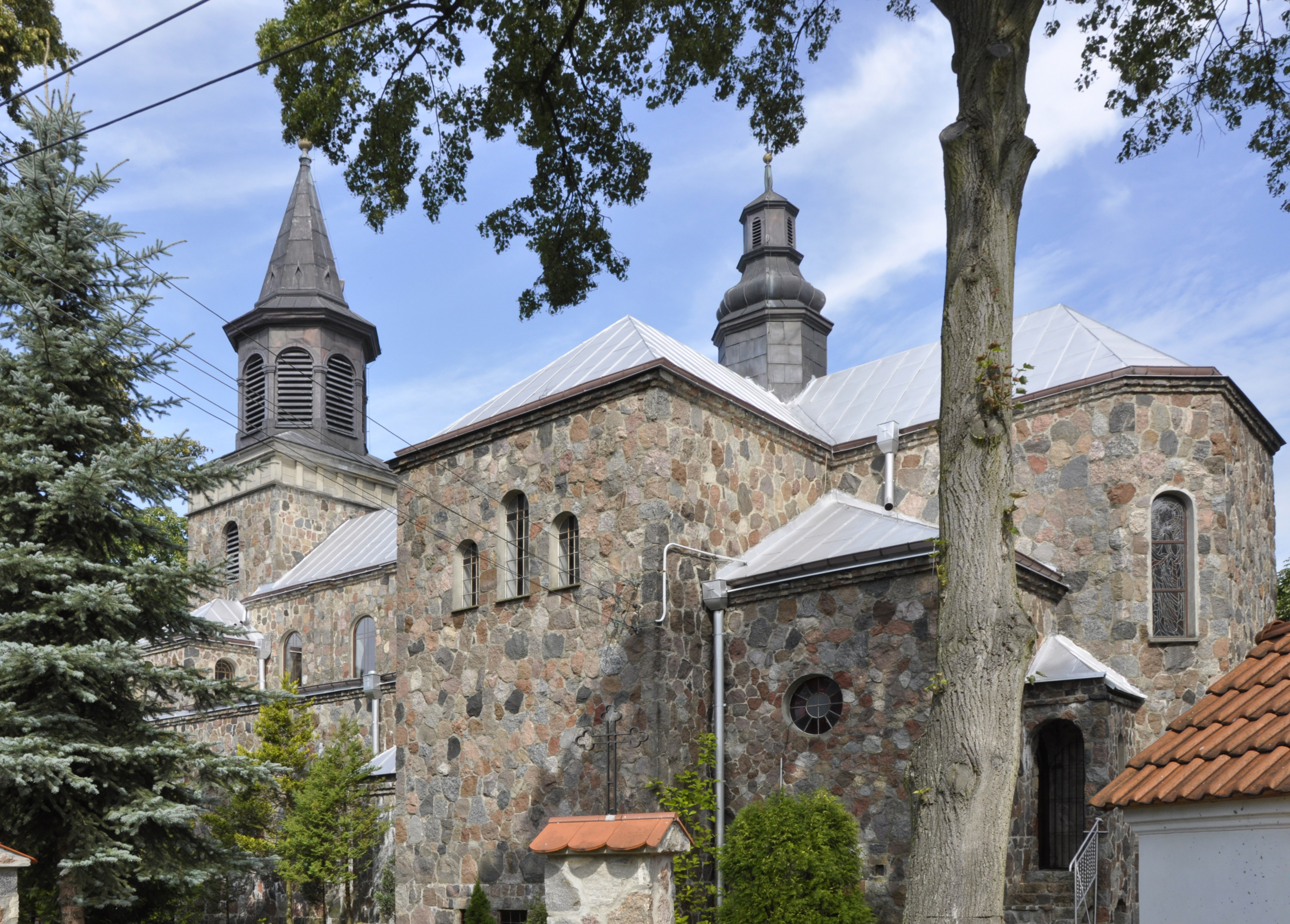
- Holy Trinity church in Konary

- Location within Poland
- Coordinates: 51°52′N 21°13′E
- Country: Poland
- Voivodeship: Masovian
- County: Grójec
- Gmina: Warka

Population
  - Total: 390
- Vehicle registration: WGR

Konary [kɔˈnarɨ] is a village in the administrative district of Gmina Warka, within Grójec County, Masovian Voivodeship, in east-central Poland.

== History ==
In 1827 Konary had a population of 393.

During the German occupation of Poland (World War II), it was the location of an Einsatzgruppen-operated penal forced labour camp.
