= Grądy, Gmina Jaktorów =

Grądy
- Village
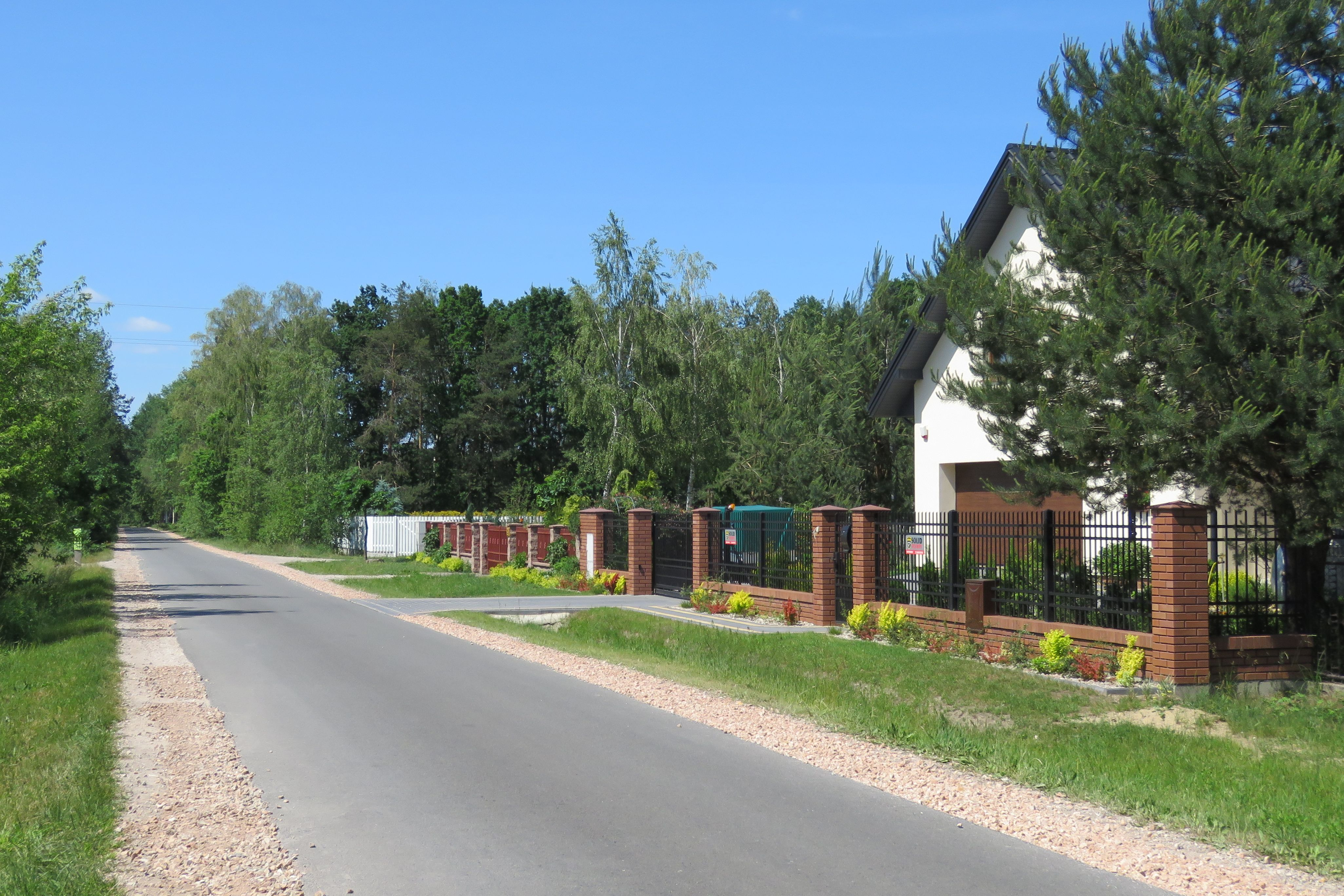

- Location within Poland
- Coordinates: 52°05′21″N 20°27′32″E
- Country: Poland
- Voivodeship: Masovian
- County: Grodzisk
- Gmina: Jaktorów

Grądy [ˈɡrɔndɨ] is a village in the administrative district of Gmina Jaktorów, within Grodzisk County, Masovian Voivodeship, in east-central Poland.
