= Maruna, Masovian Voivodeship =

Maruna
- Village
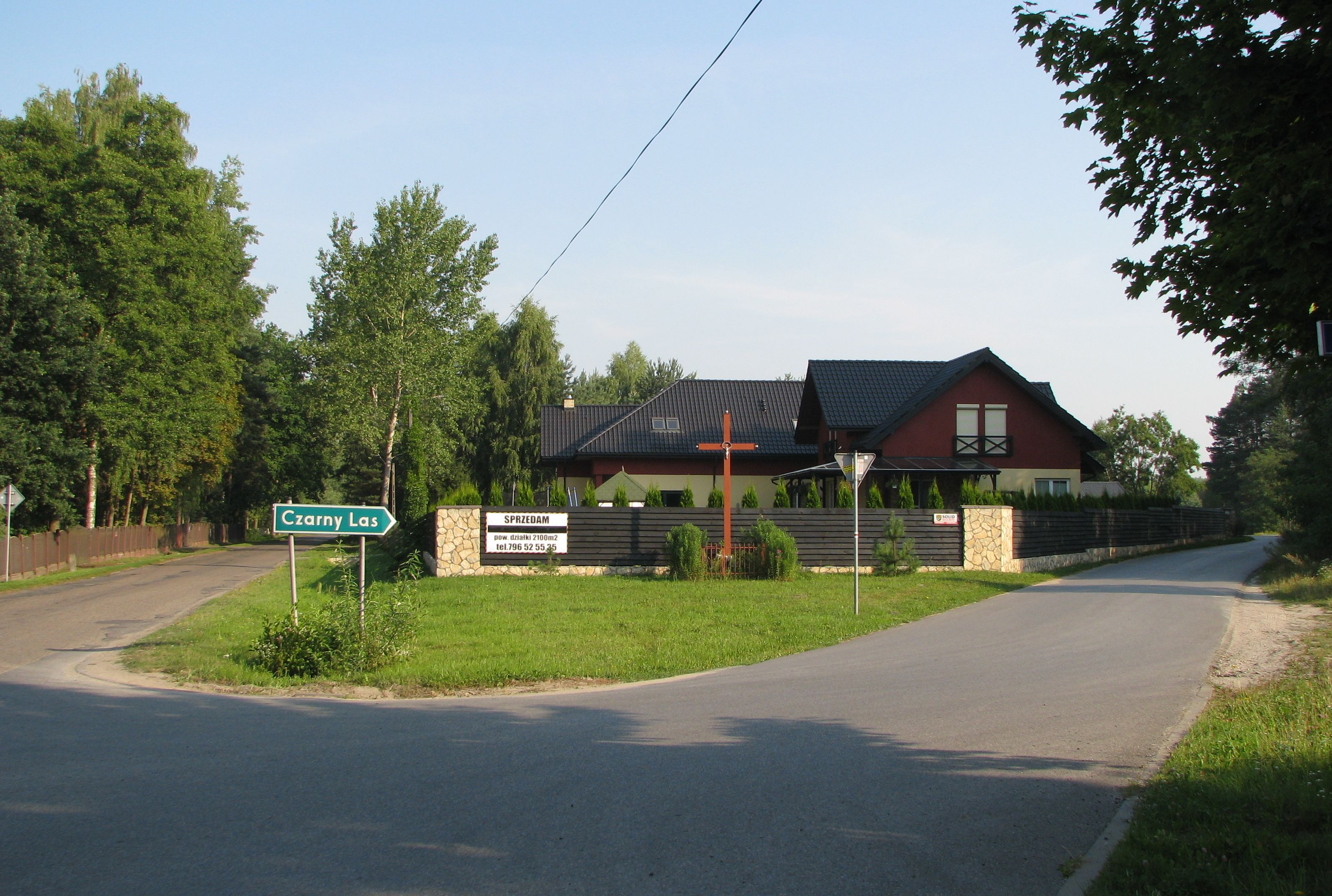

- Location within Poland
- Coordinates: 52°03′31″N 20°34′34″E
- Country: Poland
- Voivodeship: Masovian
- County: Grodzisk
- Gmina: Jaktorów

Maruna [maˈruna] is a village in the administrative district of Gmina Jaktorów, within Grodzisk County, Masovian Voivodeship, in east-central Poland.
