= Grabnik, Gmina Jaktorów =

Grabnik
- Village
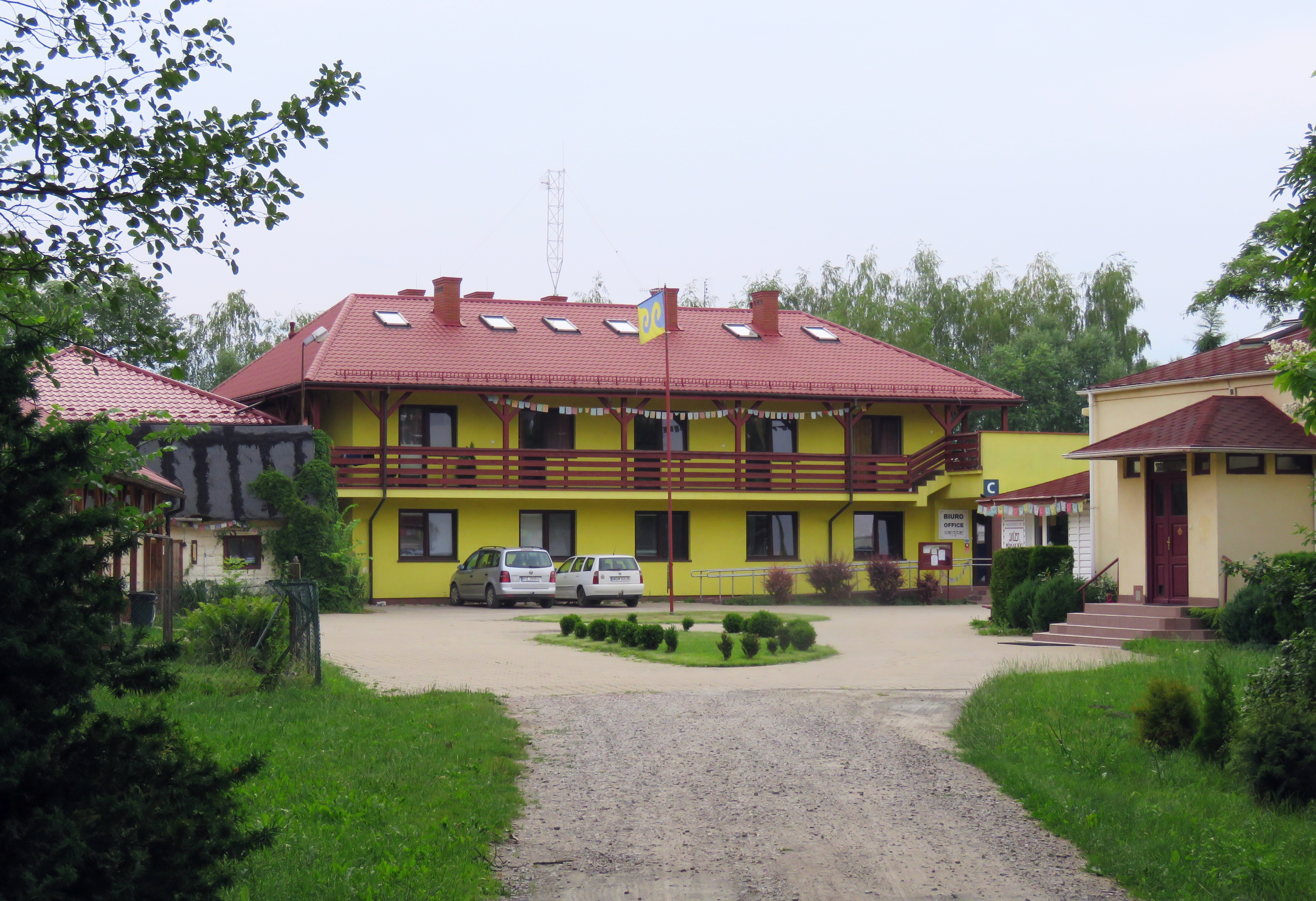
- Buddhist centre in Grabnik

- Location within Poland
- Coordinates: 52°6′47″N 20°32′31″E
- Country: Poland
- Voivodeship: Masovian
- County: Grodzisk
- Gmina: Jaktorów
- Population: 3

Grabnik [ˈɡrabnik] is a village in the administrative district of Gmina Jaktorów, within Grodzisk County, Masovian Voivodeship, in east-central Poland.
