= Budy Michałowskie, Grójec County =

Budy Michałowskie
- Village
- Location within Poland
- Coordinates: 51°42′N 21°3′E
- Country: Poland
- Voivodeship: Masovian
- County: Grójec
- Gmina: Warka
- Population: 40

Budy Michałowskie [ˈbudɨ mixaˈwɔfskʲɛ] is a village in the administrative district of Gmina Warka, within Grójec County, Masovian Voivodeship, in east-central Poland.
