= Jaktorów =

- Village
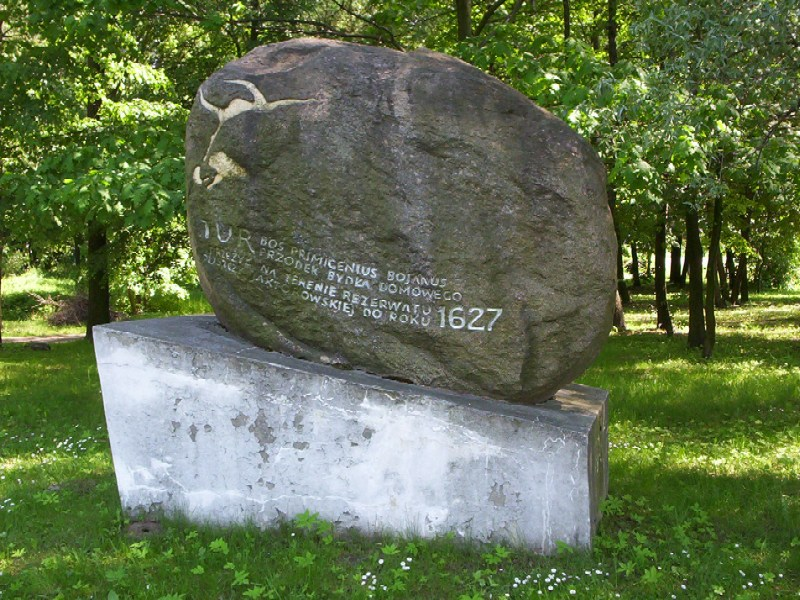
- Monument to the last aurochs

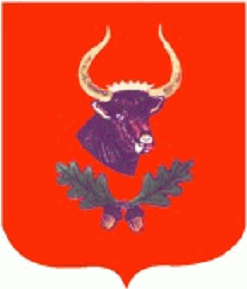
- Coat of arms

- Location within Poland
- Coordinates: 52°5′N 20°31′E
- Country: Poland
- Voivodeship: Masovian
- County: Grodzisk
- Gmina: Jaktorów
- Population: 910

Jaktorów [jakˈtɔruf] is a village in Grodzisk County, Masovian Voivodeship, in east-central Poland. It is the seat of the gmina (administrative district) called Gmina Jaktorów.

The last recorded aurochs (Bos primigenius), a female, died in 1627 in the Jaktorów Forest, Poland. Also called the urus (in Polish tur), aurochs were the ancestors of domestic cattle, inhabiting Europe, Asia, and North Africa. The skull of the last recorded specimen was later looted by the Swedish Army during the Swedish invasion of Poland (1655–1660) and is now in Livrustkammaren in Stockholm.
