= Paulin, Masovian Voivodeship =

Paulin
- Settlement
- Location within Poland
- Coordinates: 51°44′40″N 21°02′11″E
- Country: Poland
- Voivodeship: Masovian
- County: Grójec
- Gmina: Warka

Paulin [ˈpau̯lin] is a settlement in the administrative district of Gmina Warka, within Grójec County, Masovian Voivodeship, in east-central Poland.
