= Budy Michałowskie, Gmina Jaktorów =

Budy Michałowskie
- Village
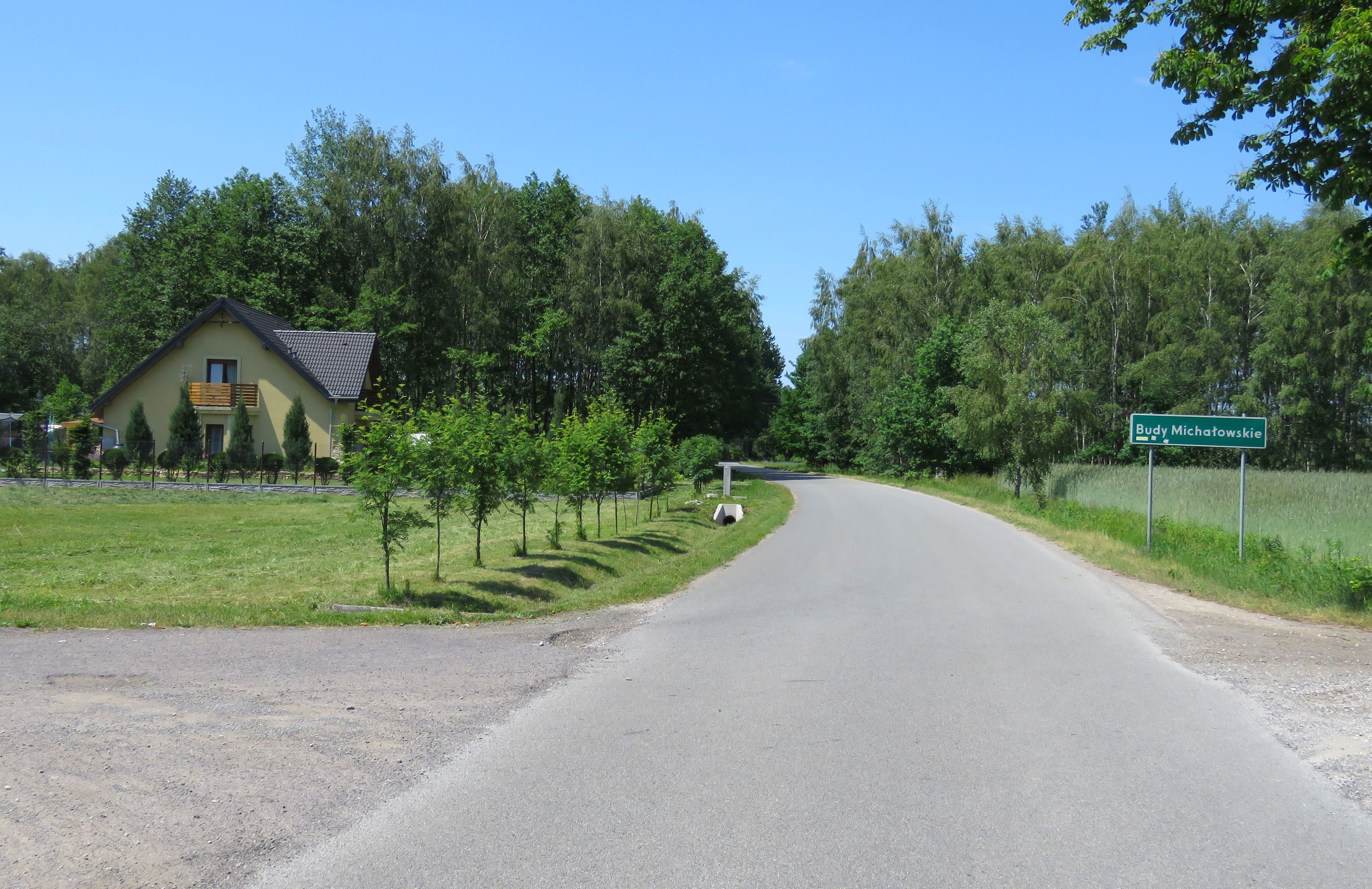

- Location within Poland
- Coordinates: 52°3′N 20°34′E
- Country: Poland
- Voivodeship: Masovian
- County: Grodzisk
- Gmina: Jaktorów
- Population: 240

Budy Michałowskie [ˈbudɨ mixaˈwɔfskʲɛ] is a village in the administrative district of Gmina Jaktorów, within Grodzisk County, Masovian Voivodeship, in east-central Poland.
