= Kołaczek, Masovian Voivodeship =

Kołaczek
- Settlement
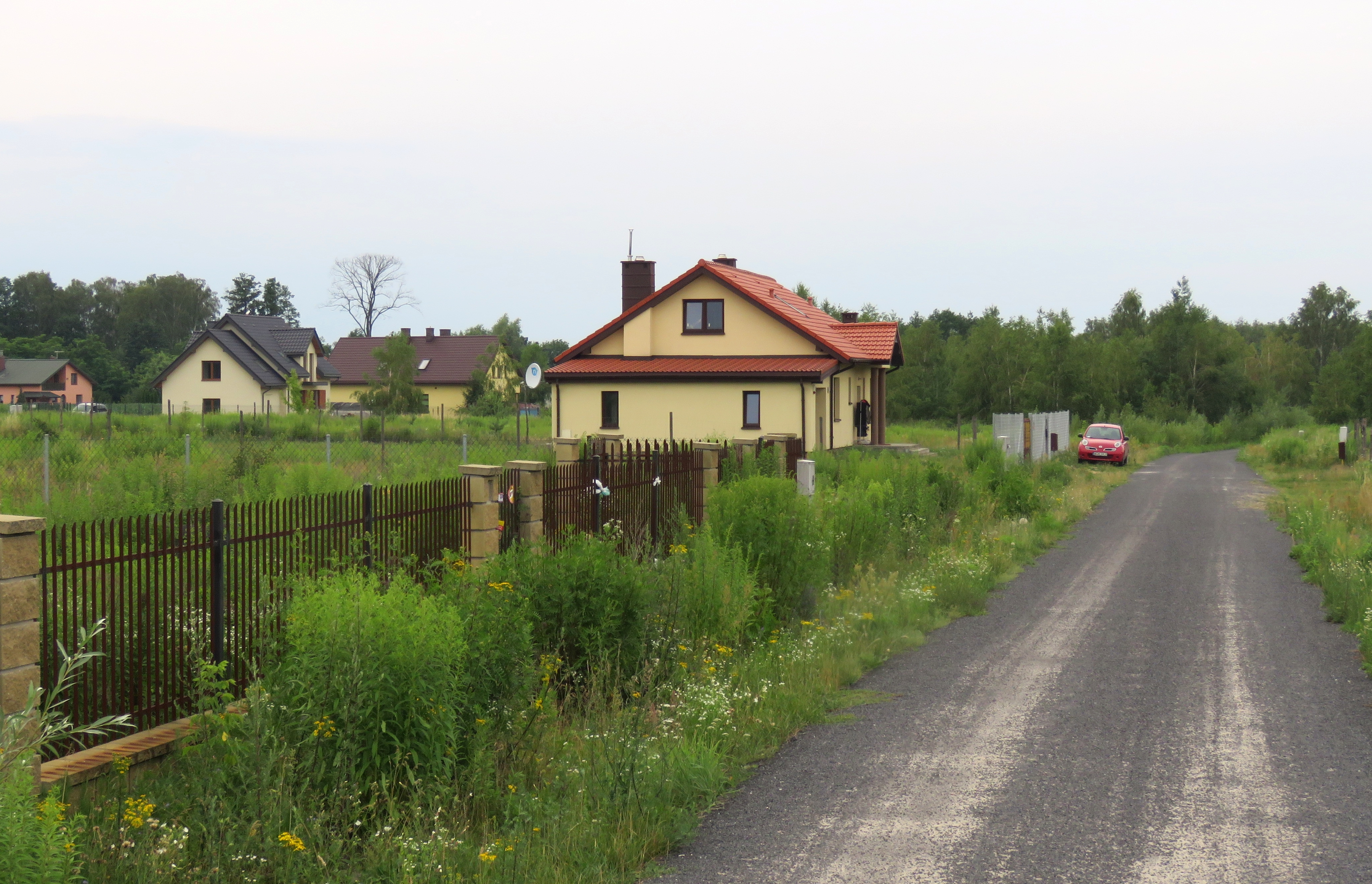

- Location within Poland
- Coordinates: 52°04′19″N 20°33′37″E
- Country: Poland
- Voivodeship: Masovian
- County: Grodzisk
- Gmina: Jaktorów

Kołaczek [kɔˈwat͡ʂɛk] is a settlement in the administrative district of Gmina Jaktorów, within Grodzisk County, Masovian Voivodeship, in east-central Poland.
