= Międzyborów =

- Village
- Location within Poland
- Coordinates: 52°4′N 20°30′E
- Country: Poland
- Voivodeship: Masovian
- County: Grodzisk
- Gmina: Jaktorów
- Population: 1,200
- Website: http://www.miedzyborow.pl

Międzyborów [mjɛnd͡zɨˈbɔruf] is a village in the administrative district of Gmina Jaktorów, within Grodzisk County, Masovian Voivodeship, in east-central Poland.
