= Grażyna, Masovian Voivodeship =

Grażyna
- Village
- Location within Poland
- Coordinates: 51°49′N 21°14′E
- Country: Poland
- Voivodeship: Masovian
- County: Grójec
- Gmina: Warka
- Population: 280

Grażyna [ɡraˈʐɨna] is a village in the administrative district of Gmina Warka, within Grójec County, Masovian Voivodeship, in east-central Poland.
