= Wólka Grodziska =

Wólka Grodziska may refer to:

- Wólka Grodziska, Masovian Voivodeship, Poland
- Wólka Grodziska, Subcarpathian Voivodeship, Poland
