= Szczęsne =

Szczęsne may refer to:

- Szczęsne, Masovian Voivodeship, Poland
- Szczęsne, Warmian-Masurian Voivodeship, Poland
