= Natolin (disambiguation) =

Natolin is a residential neighborhood in Ursynów, the southernmost district of Warsaw.

Natolin may also refer to the following villages:

- Natolin, Łódź Voivodeship (central Poland)
- Natolin, Gmina Grodzisk Mazowiecki in Masovian Voivodeship (east-central Poland)
- Natolin, Mińsk County in Masovian Voivodeship (east-central Poland)
- Natolin, Otwock County in Masovian Voivodeship (east-central Poland)
- Natolin, Sokołów County in Masovian Voivodeship (east-central Poland)
- Natolin, Węgrów County in Masovian Voivodeship (east-central Poland)
- Natolin, Radom County in Masovian Voivodeship (east-central Poland)
- Natolin, Silesian Voivodeship (south Poland)

== See also ==
- Natolin Park
