= Kałęczyn =

Kałęczyn may refer to:

- Kałęczyn, Ciechanów County in Masovian Voivodeship (east-central Poland)
- Kałęczyn, Gmina Grodzisk Mazowiecki in Masovian Voivodeship (east-central Poland)
- Kałęczyn, Podlaskie Voivodeship (north-east Poland)
- Kałęczyn, Maków County in Masovian Voivodeship (east-central Poland)
- Kałęczyn, Gmina Nur, Ostrów County in Masovian Voivodeship (east-central Poland)
- Kałęczyn, Pułtusk County in Masovian Voivodeship (east-central Poland)
- Kałęczyn, Węgrów County in Masovian Voivodeship (east-central Poland)
- Kałęczyn, Warmian-Masurian Voivodeship (north Poland)
