= Makówka =

Makówka may refer to:

- Makówka, Masovian Voivodeship, Poland
- Makówka, Podlaskie Voivodeship, Poland
