= Adamowizna =

Adamowizna may refer to either of two villages in Poland:

- Adamowizna, Masovian Voivodeship
- Adamowizna, Podlaskie Voivodeship
