= Marynin, Gmina Grodzisk Mazowiecki =

Marynin
- Village
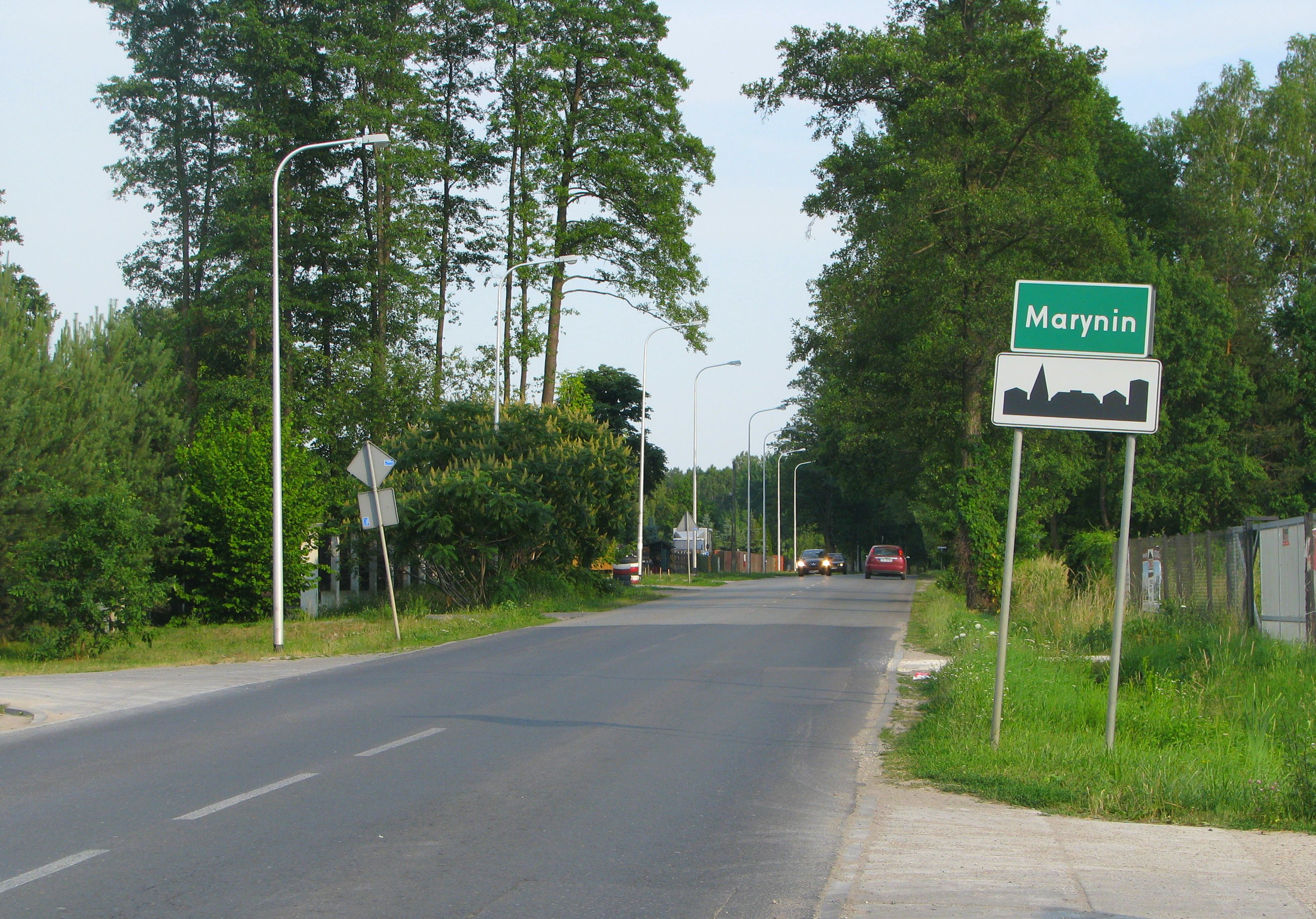

- Location within Poland
- Coordinates: 52°03′43″N 20°42′39″E
- Country: Poland
- Voivodeship: Masovian
- County: Grodzisk
- Gmina: Grodzisk Mazowiecki

Marynin [maˈrɨnin] is a village in the administrative district of Gmina Grodzisk Mazowiecki, in Grodzisk County, Masovian Voivodeship, in east-central Poland.
