= Kozerki =

- Village
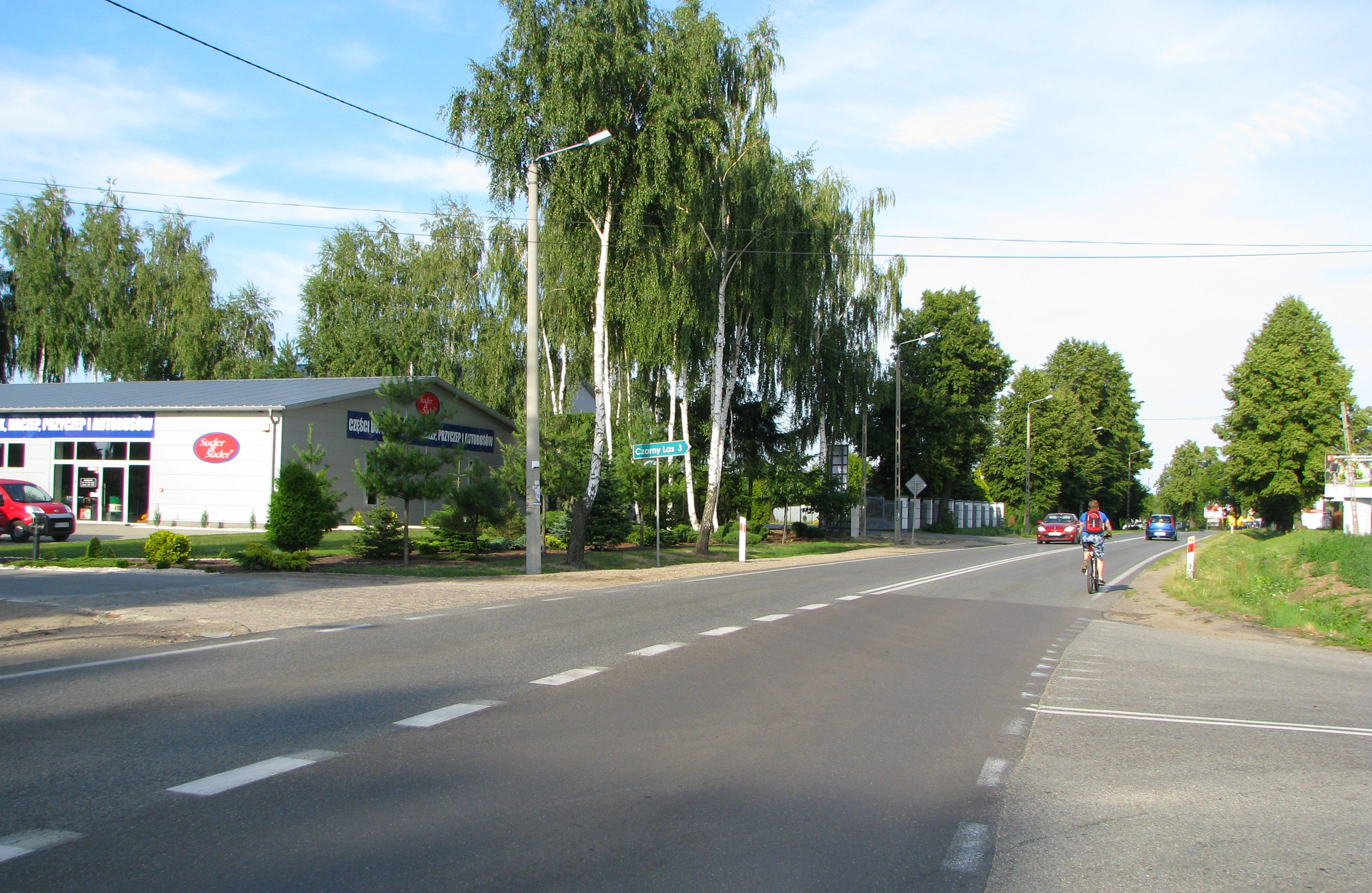

- Location within Poland
- Coordinates: 52°6′N 20°36′E
- Country: Poland
- Voivodeship: Masovian
- County: Grodzisk
- Gmina: Grodzisk Mazowiecki

Kozerki [kɔˈzɛrki] is a village in the administrative district of Gmina Grodzisk Mazowiecki, within Grodzisk County, Masovian Voivodeship, in east-central Poland.
