= Gmina Grodzisk Mazowiecki =

Polish administrative district

Gmina Grodzisk Mazowiecki Grodzisk Mazowiecki Commune
- Gmina
- Coat of arms
- Interactive map of Gmina Grodzisk Mazowiecki
- Coordinates (Grodzisk Mazowiecki): 52°6′32″N 20°37′30″E
- Country: Poland
- Voivodeship: Masovian
- County: Grodzisk
- Seat: Grodzisk Mazowiecki

Area
  - Total: 107.03 km^{2} (41.32 sq mi)

Population (2006)
  - Total: 37,432
  - Density: 349.73/km^{2} (905.81/sq mi)
  - Urban: 27,055
  - Rural: 10,377
- Website: http://www.grodzisk.pl

Gmina Grodzisk Mazowiecki is an urban-rural gmina (administrative district) in Grodzisk County, Masovian Voivodeship, in east-central Poland. Its seat is the town of Grodzisk Mazowiecki, which lies approximately 29 kilometres (18 mi) south-west of Warsaw.

The gmina covers an area of 107.03 square kilometres (41.3 sq mi), and as of 2006 its total population is 37,432 (out of which the population of Grodzisk Mazowiecki amounts to 27,055, and the population of the rural part of the gmina is 10,377).

== Villages ==
Apart from the town of Grodzisk Mazowiecki, Gmina Grodzisk Mazowiecki contains the villages and settlements of Adamów, Adamowizna, Chlebnia, Chrzanów Duży, Chrzanów Mały, Czarny Las, Izdebno Kościelne, Janinów, Kady, Kałęczyn, Kozerki, Kozery, Kraśnicza Wola, Książenice, Makówka, Marynin, Mościska, Natolin, Nowe Izdebno, Nowe Kłudno, Nowe Kozery, Odrano-Wola, Opypy, Radonie, Stare Kłudno, Szczęsne, Tłuste, Urszulin, Wężyk, Władków, Wólka Grodziska, Zabłotnia and Żuków.

== Neighbouring gminas ==
Gmina Grodzisk Mazowiecki is bordered by the town of Milanówek and by the gminas of Baranów, Błonie, Brwinów, Jaktorów, Nadarzyn, Radziejowice and Żabia Wola.
