= Czarny Las, Gmina Grodzisk Mazowiecki =

Czarny Las
- Village
- Location within Poland
- Coordinates: 52°08′53″N 20°35′17″E
- Country: Poland
- Voivodeship: Masovian
- County: Grodzisk
- Gmina: Grodzisk Mazowiecki
- Website: http://czarnylas.grodzisk.pl/

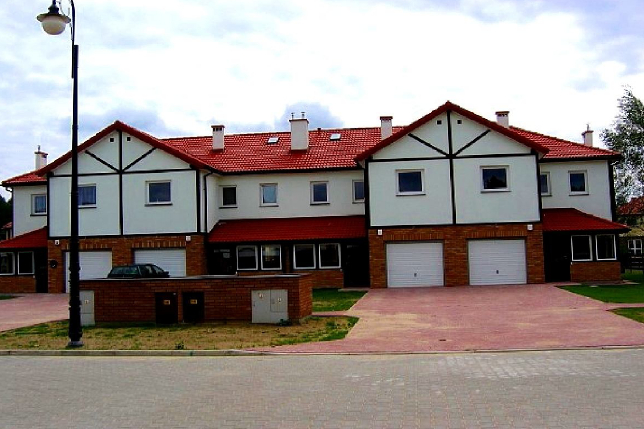
Czarny Las - Terraced Houses

Czarny Las [ˈt͡ʂarnɨ ˈlas] is a village in the administrative district of Gmina Grodzisk Mazowiecki, within Grodzisk County, Masovian Voivodeship, in east-central Poland.
