= Radonie =

- Village
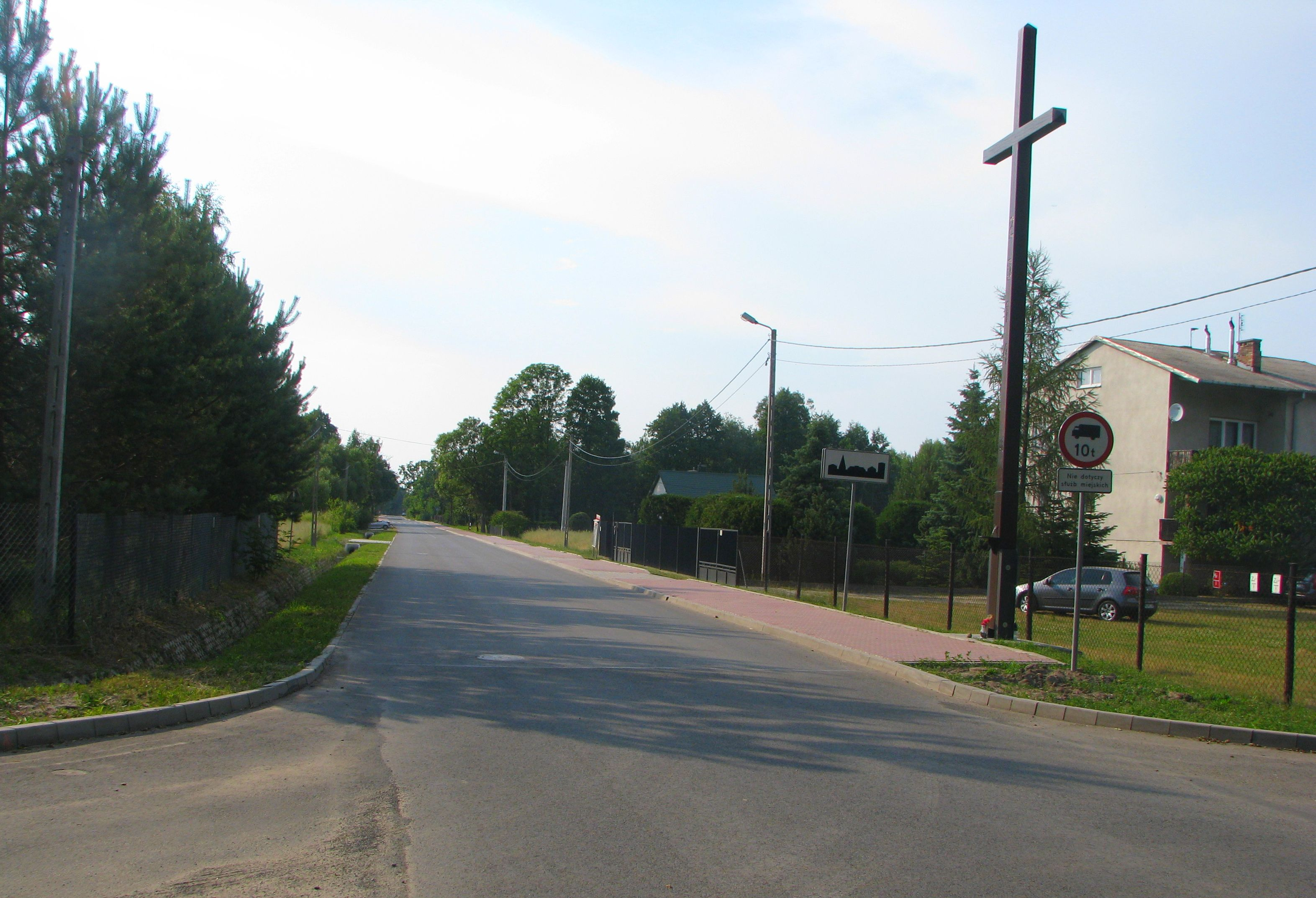

- Location within Poland
- Coordinates: 52°3′55″N 20°38′38″E
- Country: Poland
- Voivodeship: Masovian
- County: Grodzisk
- Gmina: Grodzisk Mazowiecki

Radonie [raˈdɔɲɛ] is a village in the administrative district of Gmina Grodzisk Mazowiecki, within Grodzisk County, Masovian Voivodeship, in east-central Poland.
