= Kraśnicza Wola =

- Village
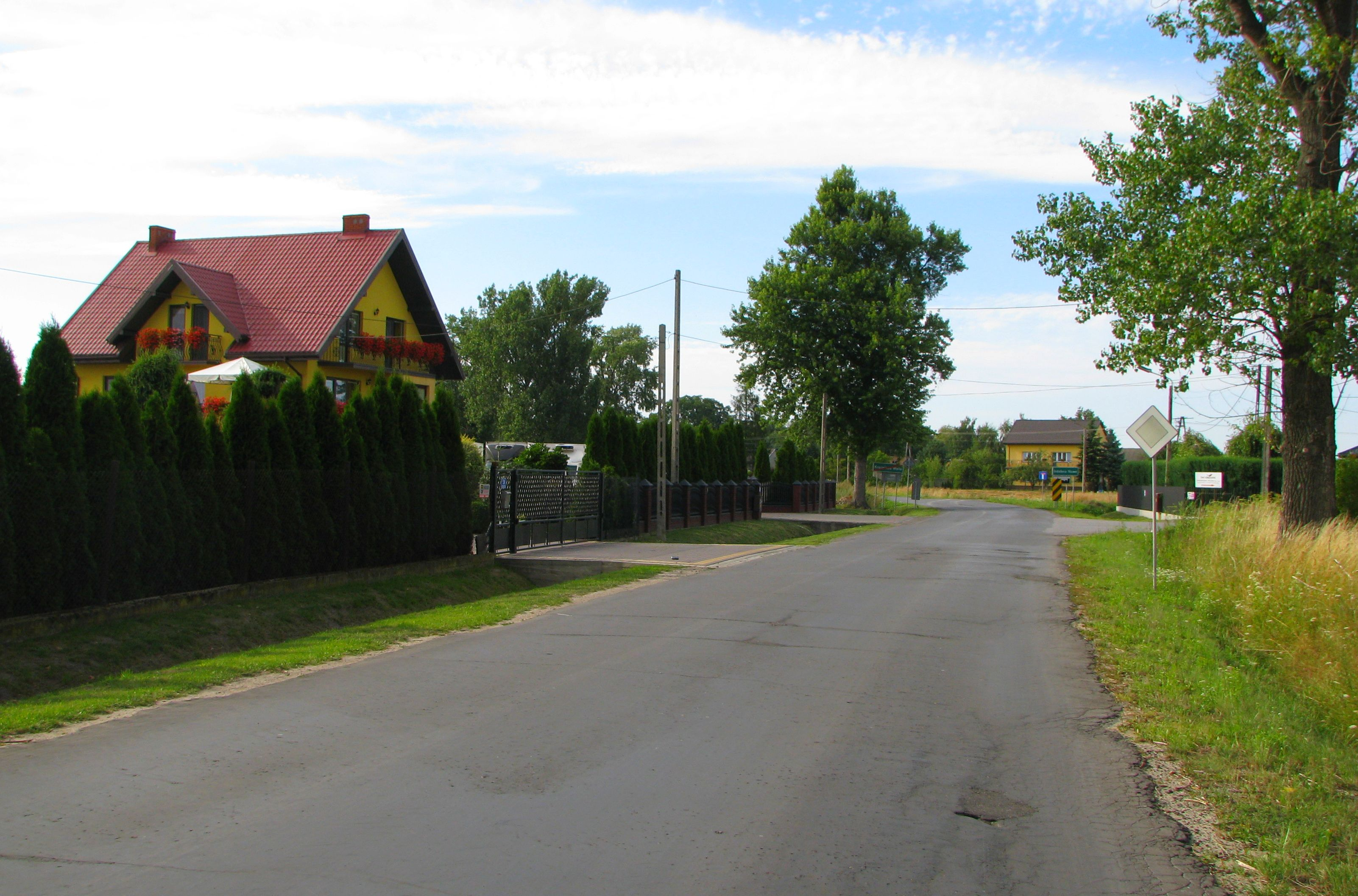

- Location within Poland
- Coordinates: 52°7′24″N 20°33′50″E
- Country: Poland
- Voivodeship: Masovian
- County: Grodzisk
- Gmina: Grodzisk Mazowiecki

Kraśnicza Wola [kraɕˈnit͡ʂa ˈvɔla] is a village in the administrative district of Gmina Grodzisk Mazowiecki, within Grodzisk County, Masovian Voivodeship, in east-central Poland.
