= Urszulin, Masovian Voivodeship =

Urszulin
- Village
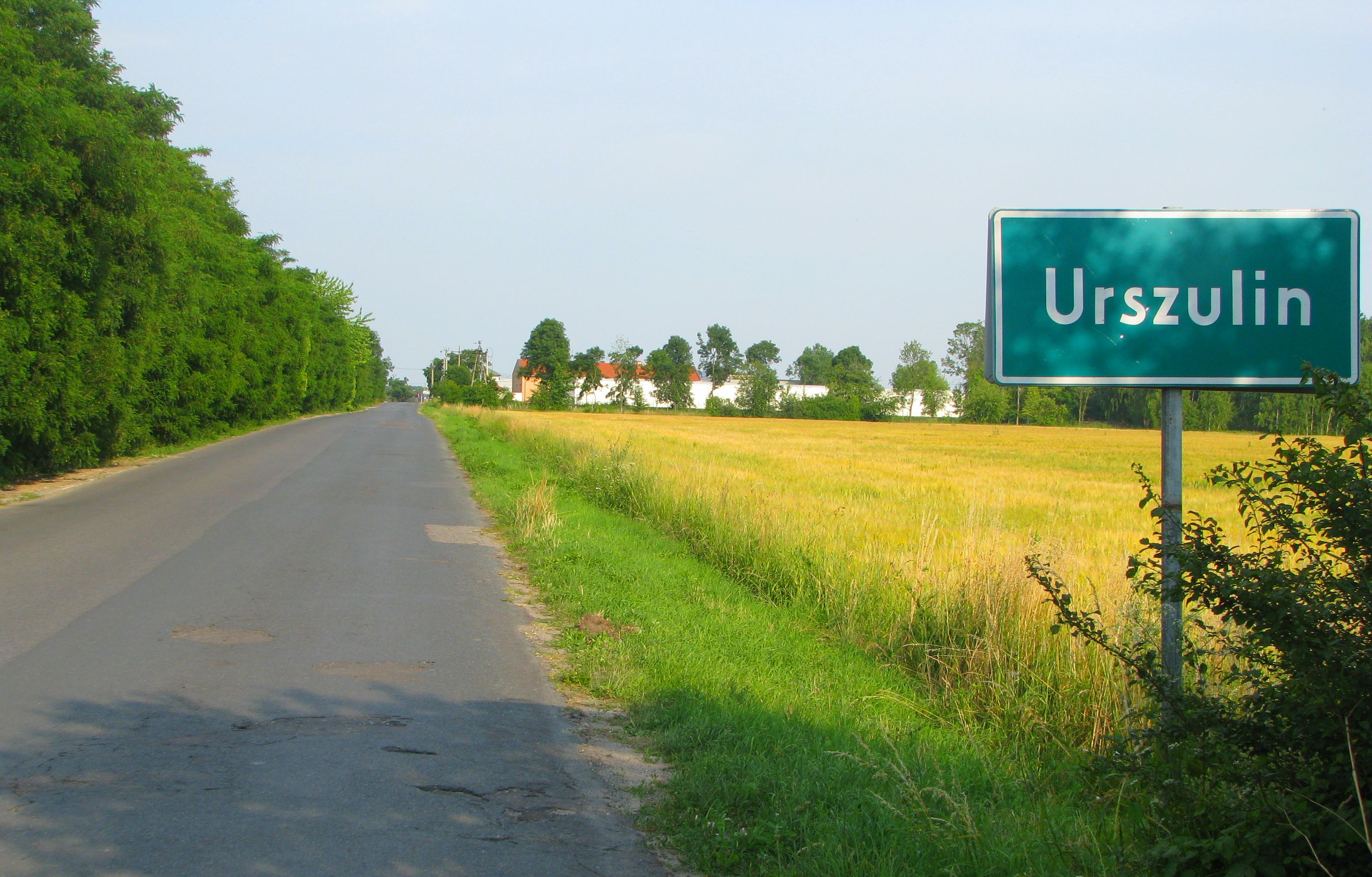

- Location within Poland
- Coordinates: 52°4′52″N 20°43′22″E
- Country: Poland
- Voivodeship: Masovian
- County: Grodzisk
- Gmina: Grodzisk Mazowiecki
- Population: 120

Urszulin (Polish pronunciation: [urˈʂulin]) is a village in the administrative district of Gmina Grodzisk Mazowiecki, within Grodzisk County, Masovian Voivodeship, in east-central Poland.
