= Stare Kłudno =

- Village
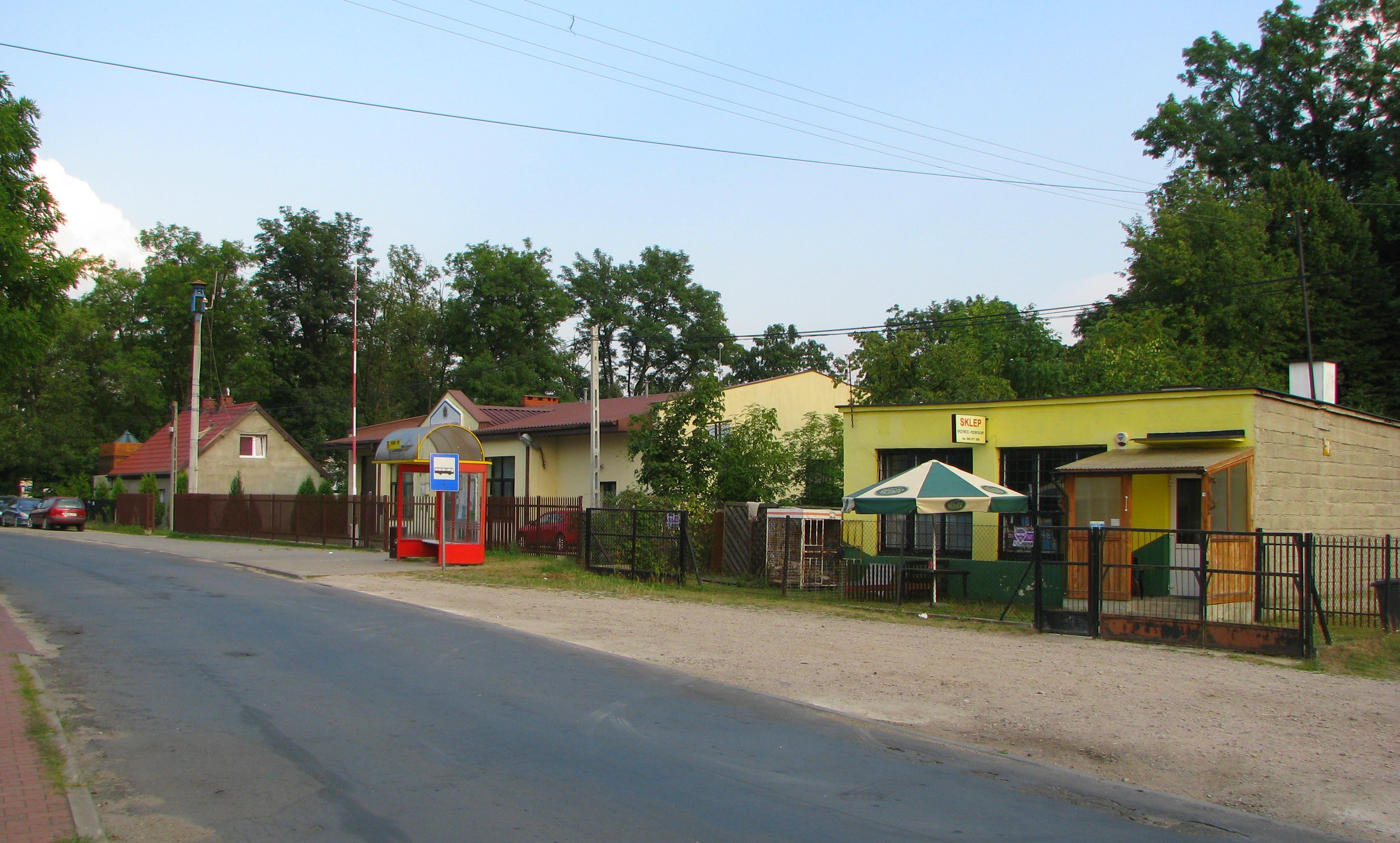

- Location within Poland
- Coordinates: 52°09′06″N 20°35′47″E
- Country: Poland
- Voivodeship: Masovian
- County: Grodzisk
- Gmina: Grodzisk Mazowiecki

Stare Kłudno [ˈstarɛ ˈkwudnɔ] is a village in the administrative district of Gmina Grodzisk Mazowiecki, within Grodzisk County, Masovian Voivodeship, in east-central Poland.
