= Wężyk, Masovian Voivodeship =

Wężyk
- Village
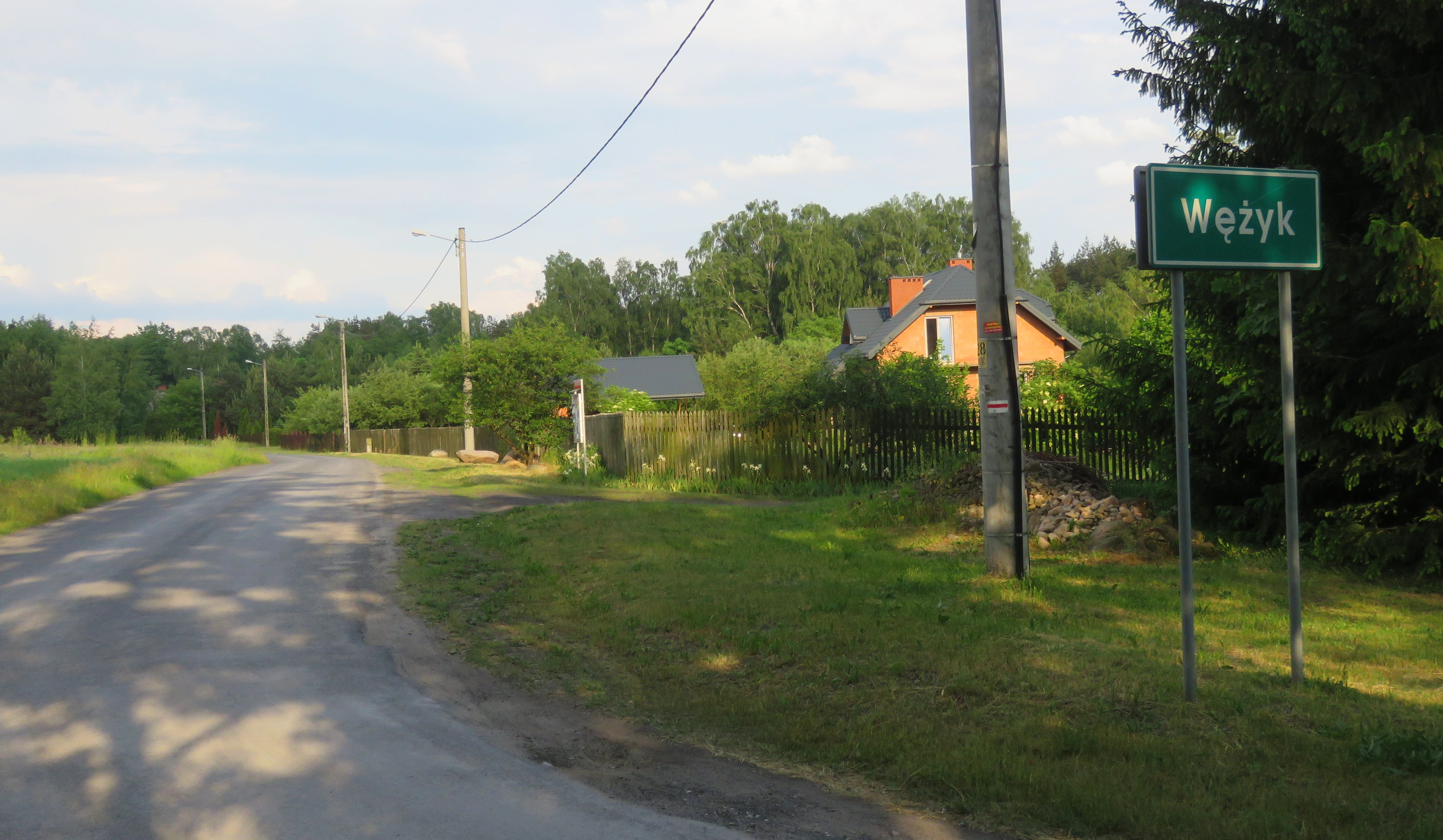

- Location within Poland
- Coordinates: 52°02′00″N 20°37′21″E
- Country: Poland
- Voivodeship: Masovian
- County: Grodzisk
- Gmina: Grodzisk Mazowiecki

Wężyk [ˈvɛ̃ʐɨk] is a village in the administrative district of Gmina Grodzisk Mazowiecki, within Grodzisk County, Masovian Voivodeship, in east-central Poland.
