= Odrano-Wola =

- Village
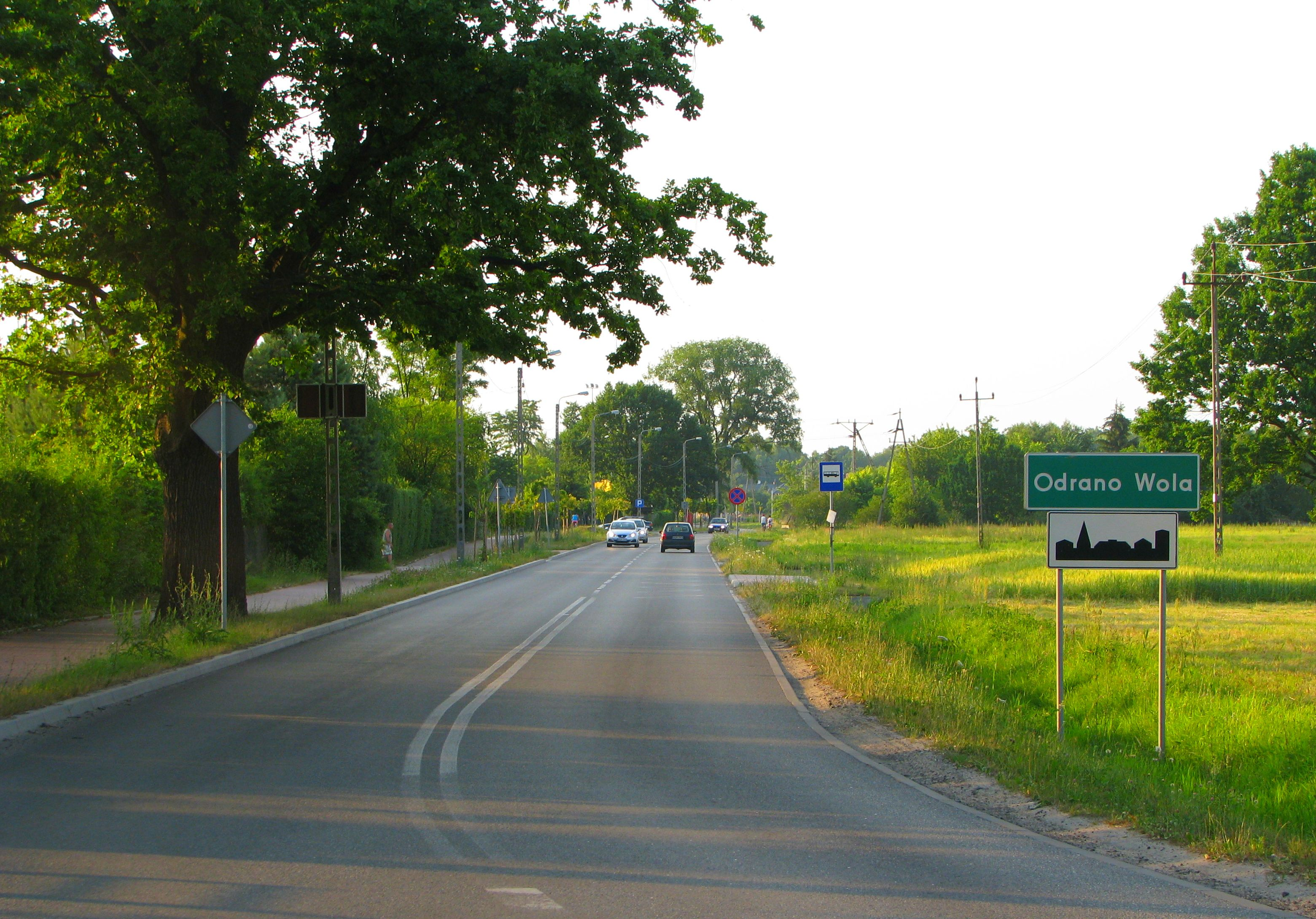

- Location within Poland
- Coordinates: 52°05′29″N 20°38′25″E
- Country: Poland
- Voivodeship: Masovian
- County: Grodzisk
- Gmina: Grodzisk Mazowiecki
- Population: 986
- Website: http://www.odrano-wola.pl/

Odrano-Wola [ɔˈdranɔ ˈvɔla] is a village in the administrative district of Gmina Grodzisk Mazowiecki, within Grodzisk County, Masovian Voivodeship, in east-central Poland.
