= Mościska, Gmina Grodzisk Mazowiecki =

Mościska
- Village
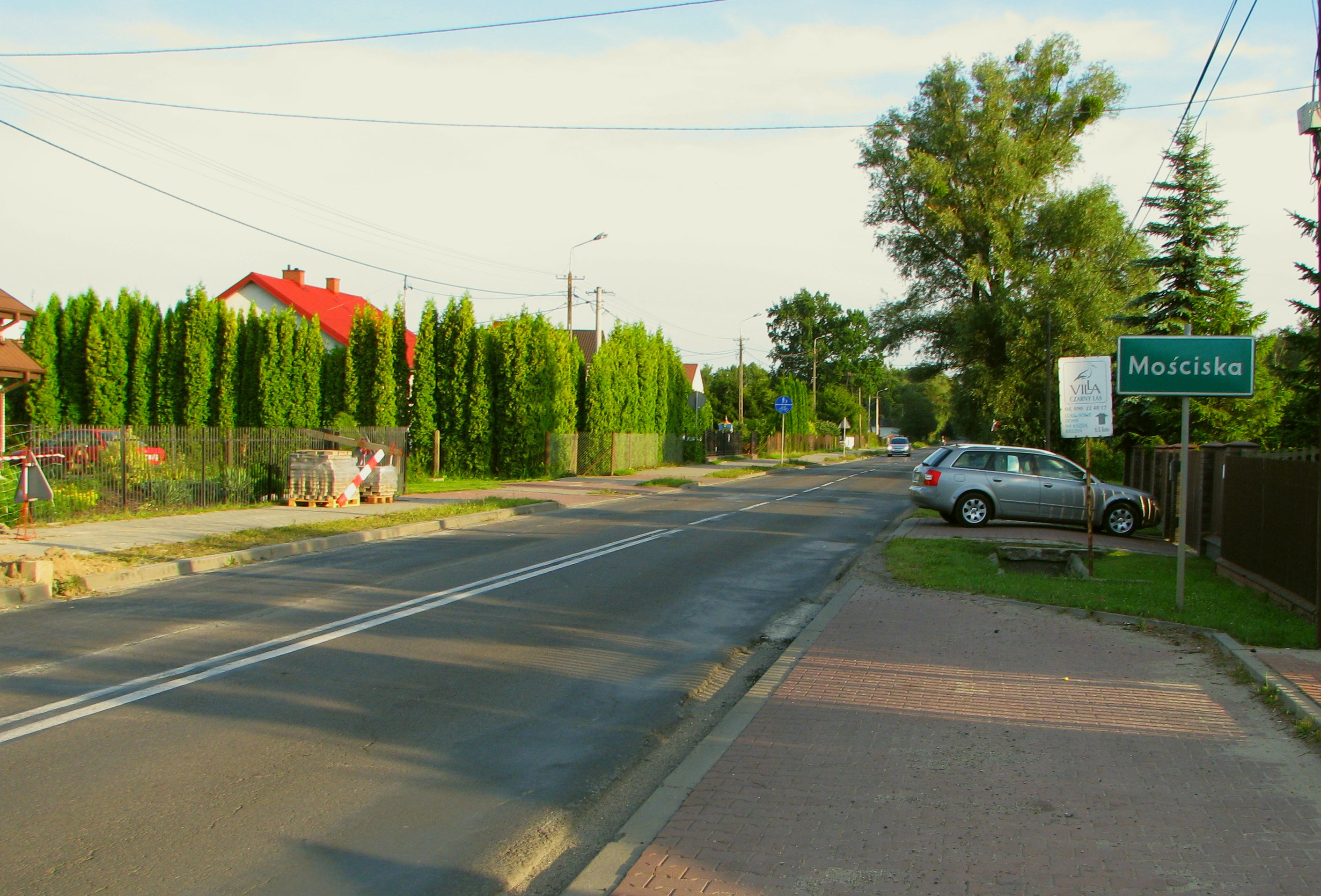

- Location within Poland
- Coordinates: 52°4′N 20°37′E
- Country: Poland
- Voivodeship: Masovian
- County: Grodzisk
- Gmina: Grodzisk Mazowiecki

Mościska [mɔɕˈt͡ɕiska] is a village in the administrative district of Gmina Grodzisk Mazowiecki, within Grodzisk County, Masovian Voivodeship, in east-central Poland.
