= Żuków, Gmina Grodzisk Mazowiecki =

Żuków
- Village
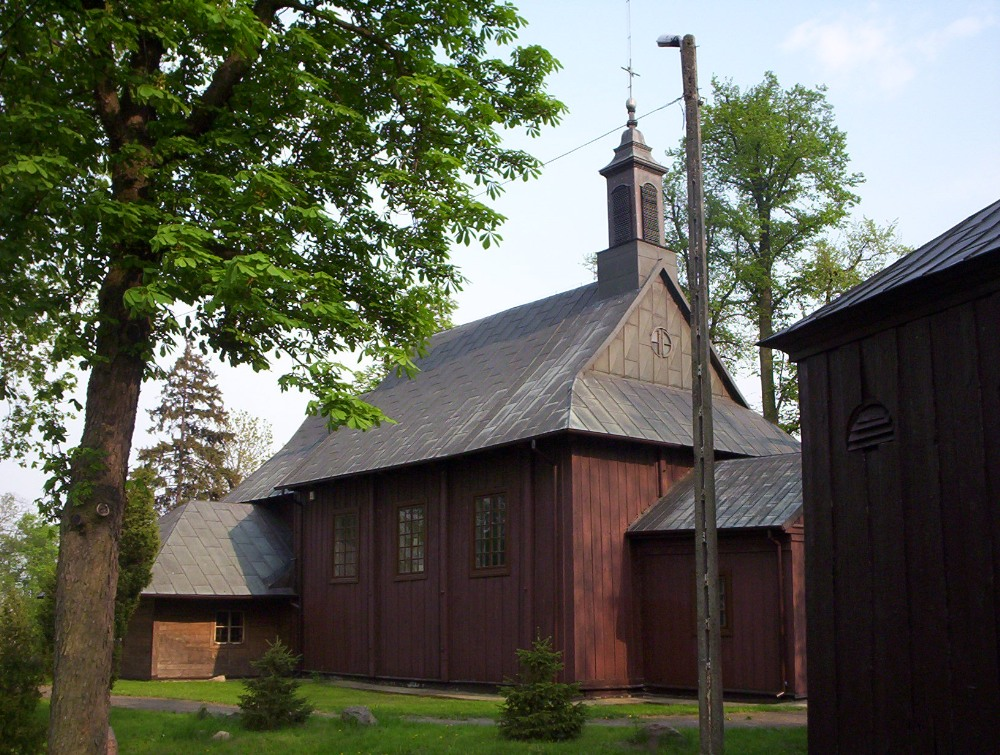

- Location within Poland
- Coordinates: 52°09′08″N 20°38′50″E
- Country: Poland
- Voivodeship: Masovian
- County: Grodzisk
- Gmina: Grodzisk Mazowiecki

Żuków [ˈʐukuf] is a village in the administrative district of Gmina Grodzisk Mazowiecki, within Grodzisk County, Masovian Voivodeship, in east-central Poland.
