= Władków =

- Village
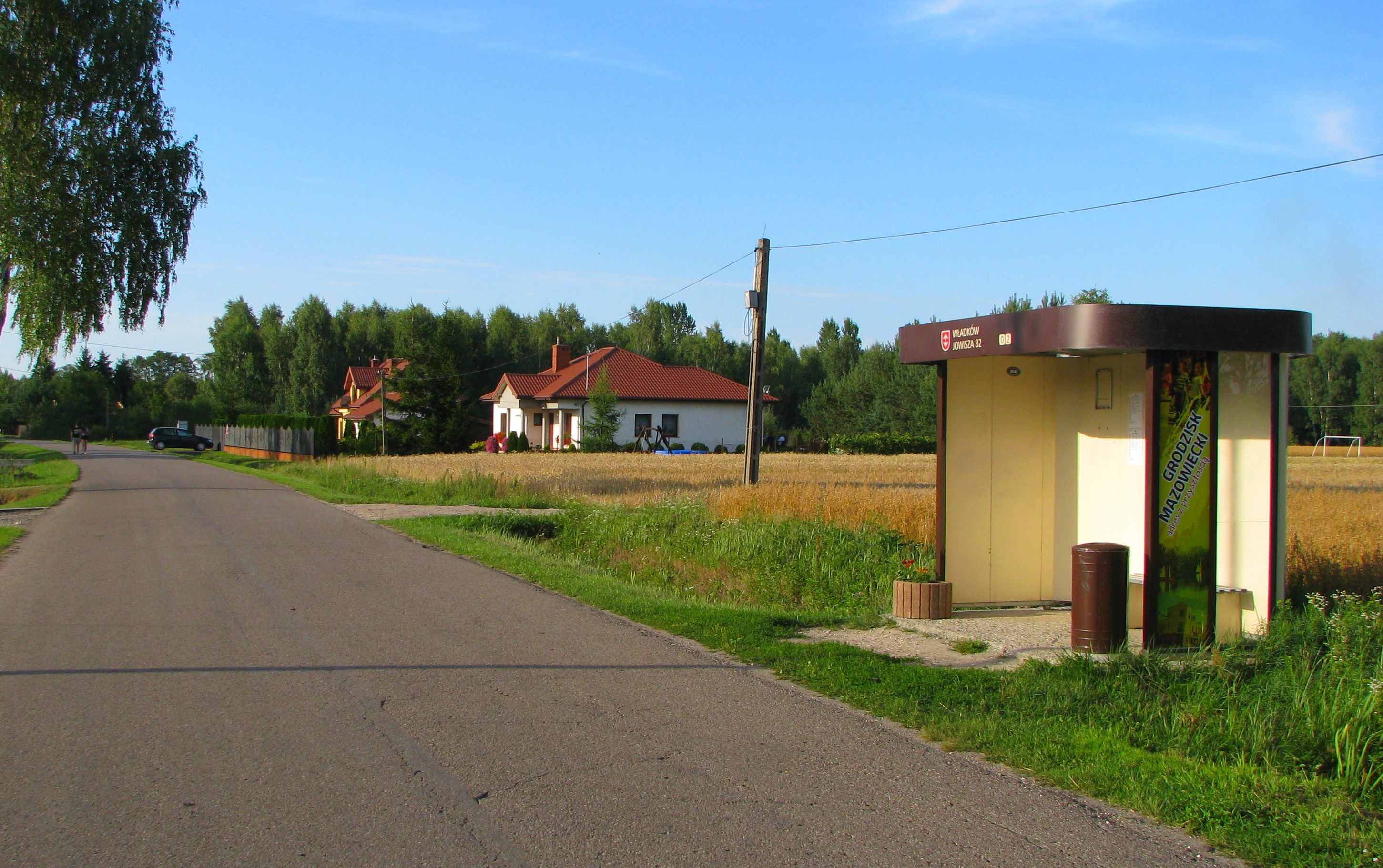

- Location within Poland
- Coordinates: 52°04′38″N 20°34′59″E
- Country: Poland
- Voivodeship: Masovian
- County: Grodzisk
- Gmina: Grodzisk Mazowiecki

Władków [ˈvwatkuf] is a village in the administrative district of Gmina Grodzisk Mazowiecki, within Grodzisk County, Masovian Voivodeship, in east-central Poland.
