= Natolin, Gmina Grodzisk Mazowiecki =

Natolin
- Village
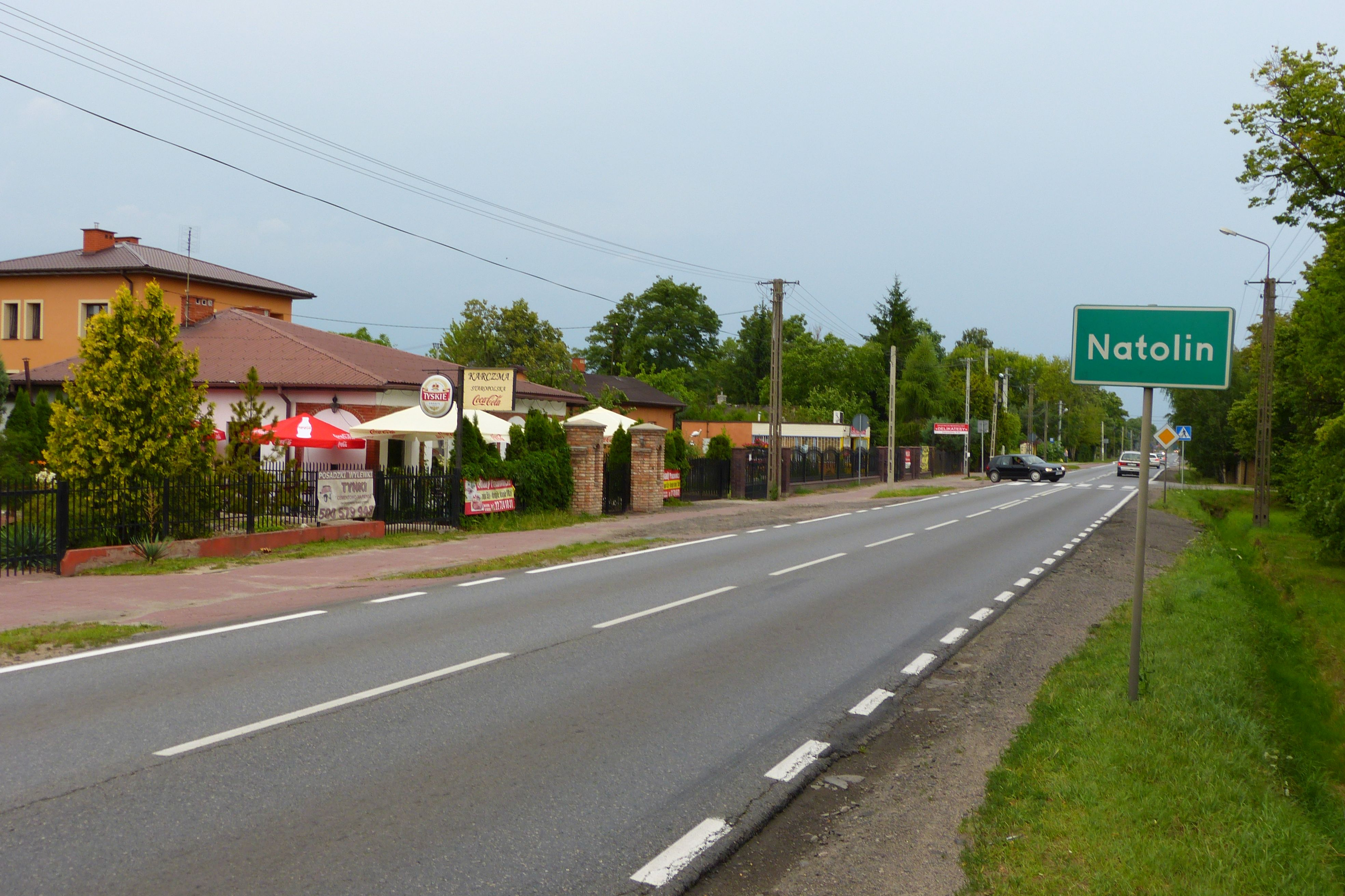

- Location within Poland
- Coordinates: 52°8′N 20°37′E
- Country: Poland
- Voivodeship: Masovian
- County: Grodzisk
- Gmina: Grodzisk Mazowiecki

Natolin [naˈtɔlin] is a village in the administrative district of Gmina Grodzisk Mazowiecki, within Grodzisk County, Masovian Voivodeship, in east-central Poland.
