= Wólka Grodziska, Masovian Voivodeship =

Wólka Grodziska
- Village
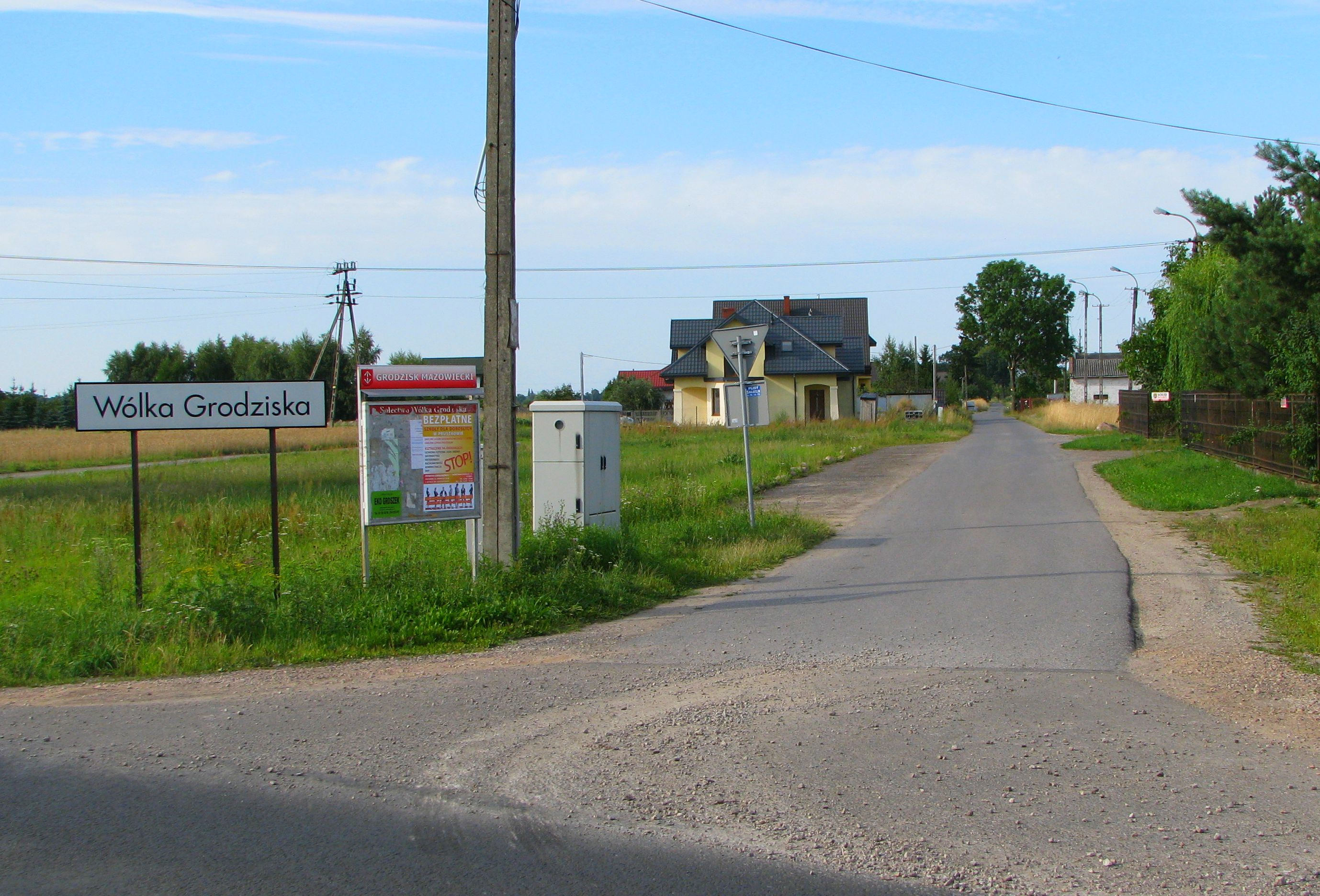

- Location within Poland
- Coordinates: 52°06′36″N 20°35′58″E
- Country: Poland
- Voivodeship: Masovian
- County: Grodzisk
- Gmina: Grodzisk Mazowiecki

Wólka Grodziska [ˈvulka ɡrɔˈd͡ʑiska] is a village in the administrative district of Gmina Grodzisk Mazowiecki, within Grodzisk County, Masovian Voivodeship, in east-central Poland.
