= Szczęsne, Masovian Voivodeship =

Szczęsne
- Village
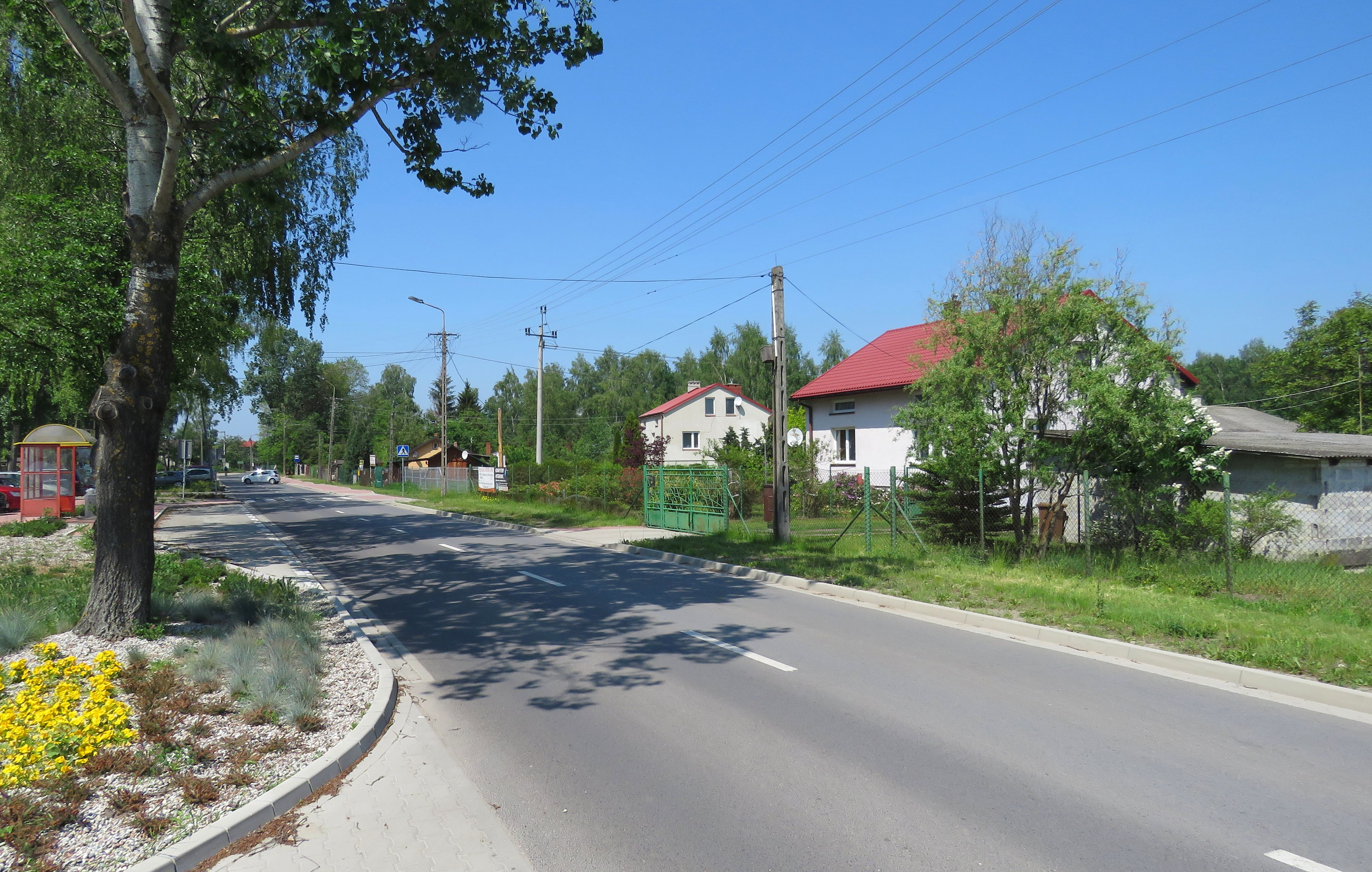

- Location within Poland
- Coordinates: 52°04′59″N 20°39′02″E
- Country: Poland
- Voivodeship: Masovian
- County: Grodzisk
- Gmina: Grodzisk Mazowiecki

Szczęsne [ˈʂt͡ʂɛ̃snɛ] is a village in the administrative district of Gmina Grodzisk Mazowiecki, within Grodzisk County, Masovian Voivodeship, in east-central Poland.
