= Kałęczyn, Gmina Grodzisk Mazowiecki =

Kałęczyn
- Village
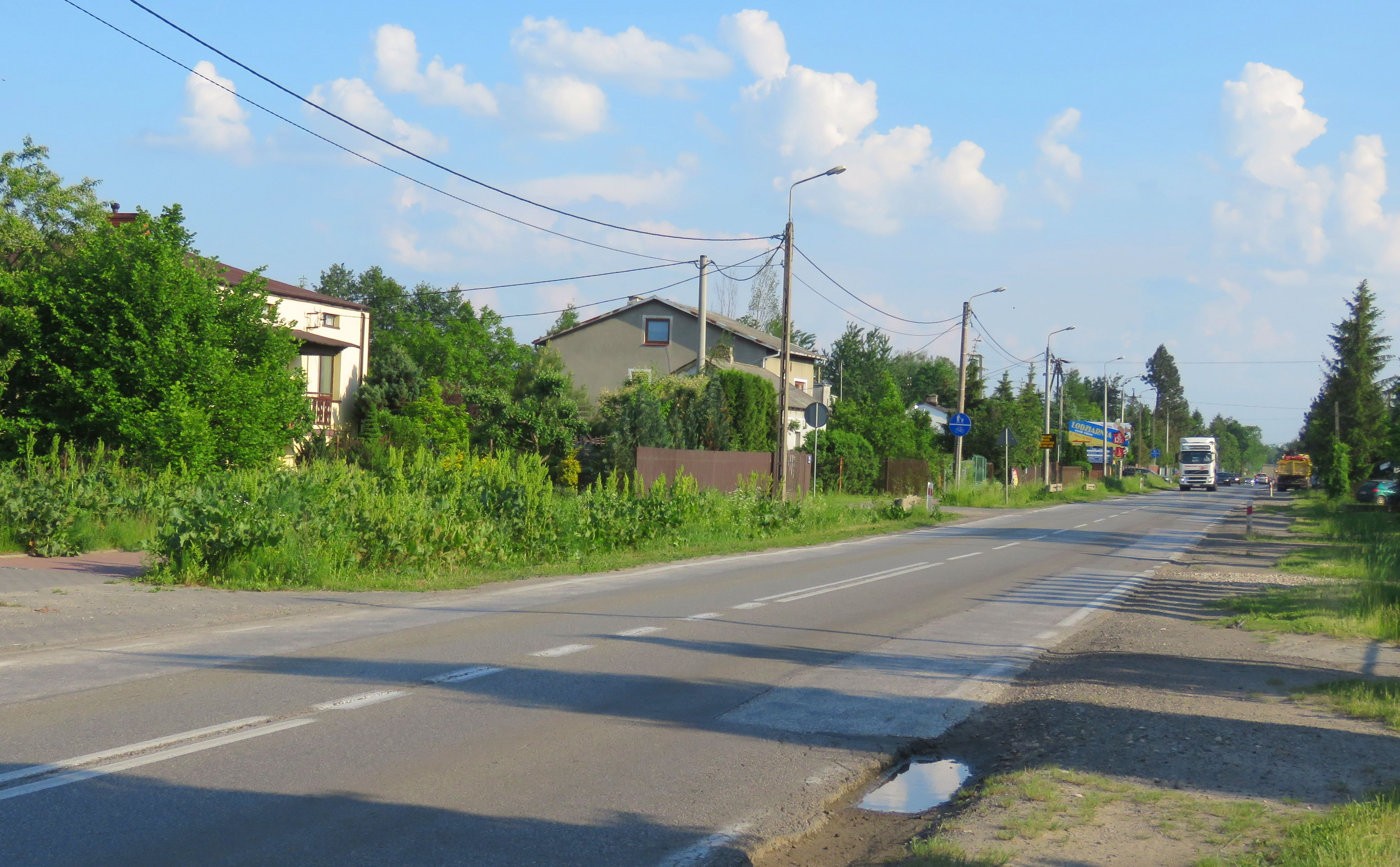

- Location within Poland
- Coordinates: 52°08′09″N 20°36′42″E
- Country: Poland
- Voivodeship: Masovian
- County: Grodzisk
- Gmina: Grodzisk Mazowiecki

Kałęczyn [kaˈwɛnt͡ʂɨn] is a village in the administrative district of Gmina Grodzisk Mazowiecki, within Grodzisk County, Masovian Voivodeship, in east-central Poland.
