= Adamowizna, Masovian Voivodeship =

Adamowizna
- Village
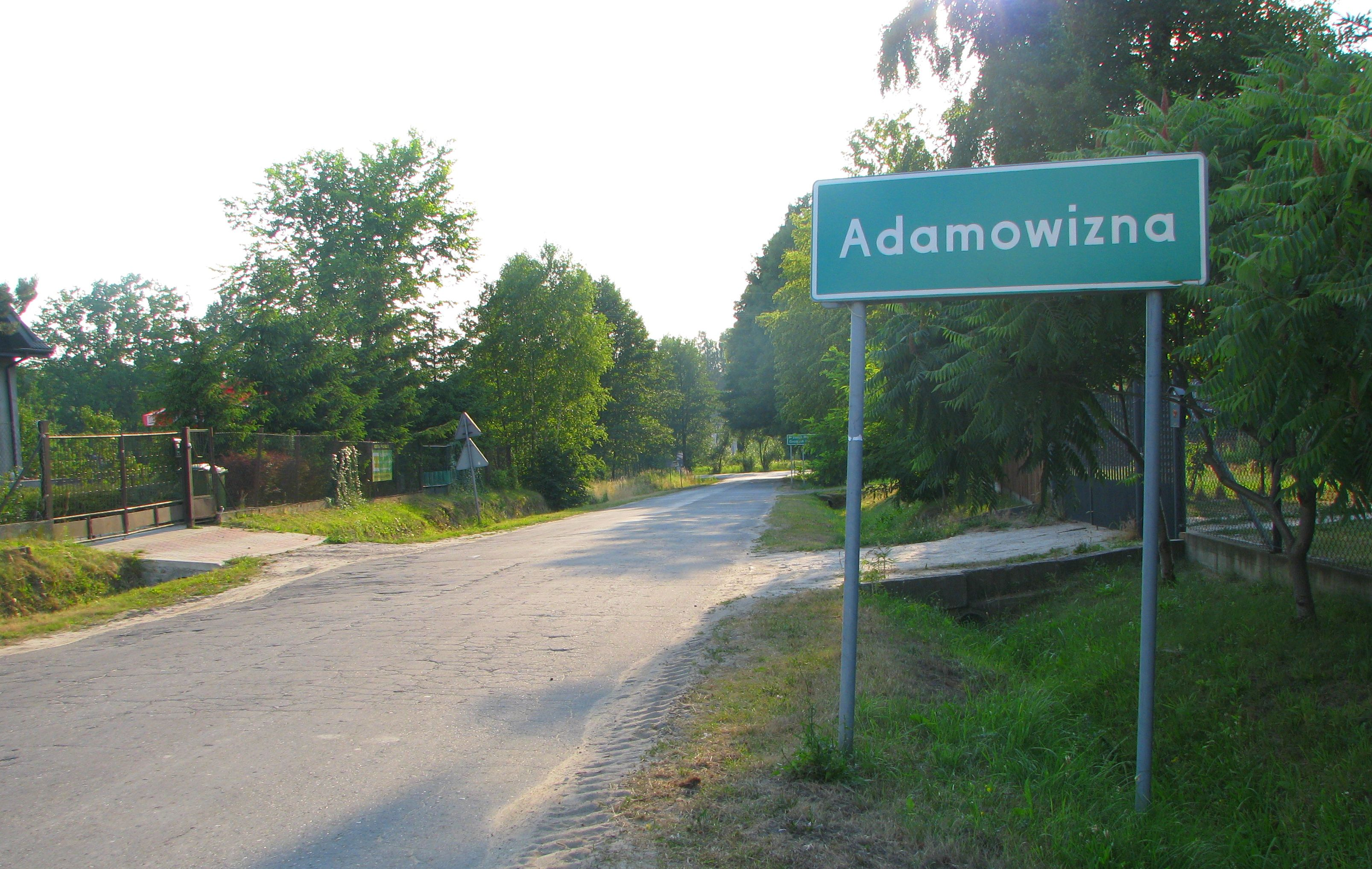

- Location within Poland
- Coordinates: 52°4′20″N 20°37′56″E
- Country: Poland
- Voivodeship: Masovian
- County: Grodzisk
- Gmina: Grodzisk Mazowiecki

Adamowizna [adamɔˈvizna] is a village in the administrative district of Gmina Grodzisk Mazowiecki, within Grodzisk County, Masovian Voivodeship, in east-central Poland.
