= Makówka, Masovian Voivodeship =

Makówka
- Village
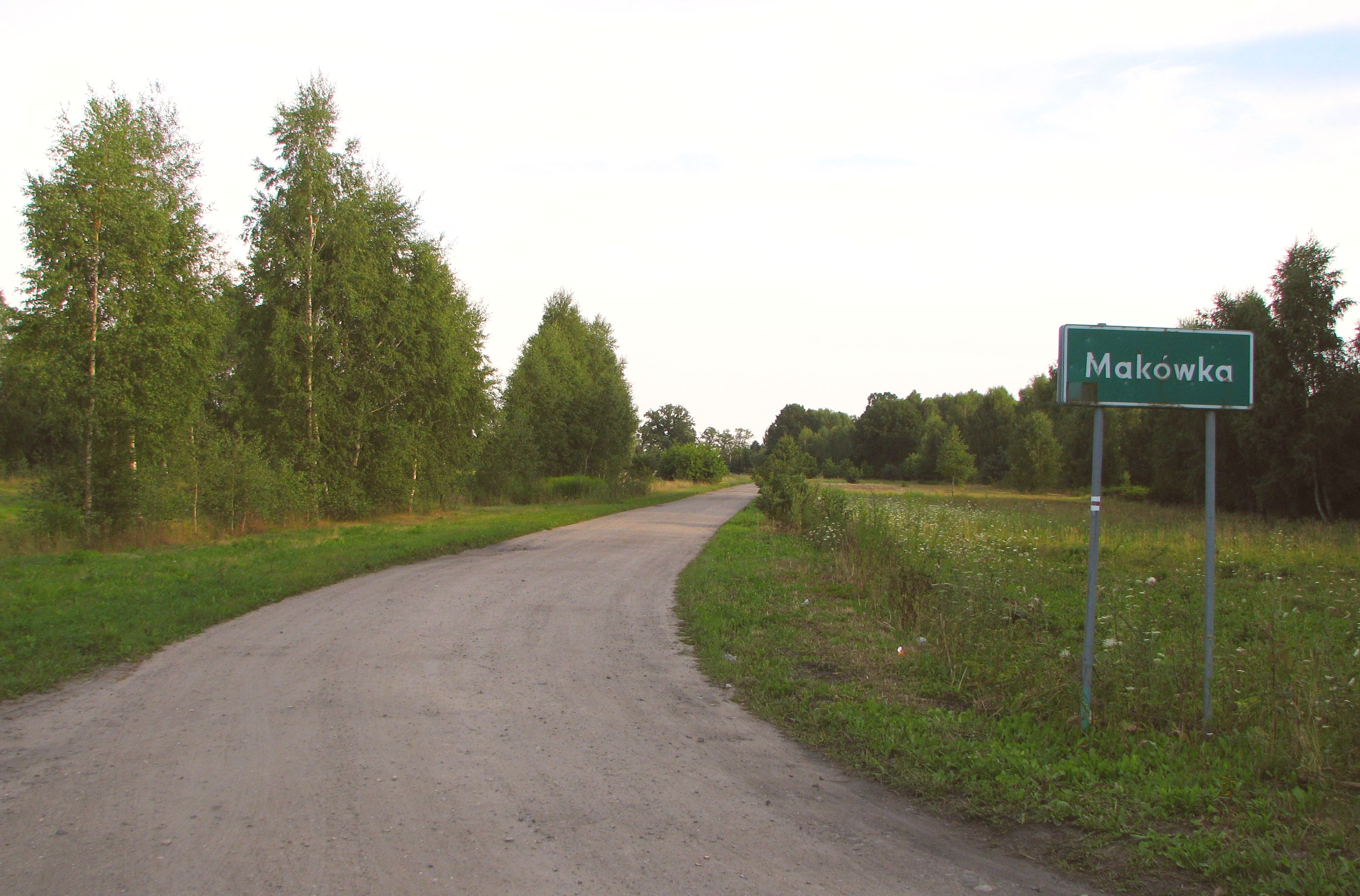

- Location within Poland
- Coordinates: 52°3′N 20°36′E
- Country: Poland
- Voivodeship: Masovian
- County: Grodzisk
- Gmina: Grodzisk Mazowiecki
- Population: 240

Makówka [maˈkufka] is a village in the administrative district of Gmina Grodzisk Mazowiecki, within Grodzisk County, Masovian Voivodeship, in east-central Poland.
