= Stowbtsy-Naliboki Group =

Partisan unit of the Home Army

- Zgrupowanie Stołpecko-Nalibockie
- Active: June 3, 1943–January 17, 1945
- Country: Polish Underground State
- Allegiance: Nowogródek District of the Home Army; Kampinos Group; 25th Infantry Regiment of the Home Army
- Type: ground force
- Garrison/HQ: Naliboki forest Kampinos Forest

Commanders
- Notable commanders: Kacper Miłaszewski, codenamed Lewald (first commander); Adolf Pilch, codenamed Dolina (last commander)

The Stowbtsy-Naliboki Group was a partisan unit of the Home Army organized in the Stowbtsy District in the Eastern Borderlands, fighting from 1943 to 1945 in the Nowogródek Voivodeship, during the Warsaw Uprising, and in the Piotrków and Kielce regions.

The Stowbtsy-Naliboki Group originated from the Polish Partisan Unit organized in June 1943 at the Nowogródek District of the Home Army. In its initial months, the unit engaged in intensive combat against the Germans, cooperating with Soviet partisans. However, in December 1943, the Soviets deceitfully abducted the battalion command and disarmed most of its subunits. Second Lieutenant Adolf Pilch, codenamed Góra/Dolina, took command of the remnants and, with his superiors' consent, temporarily truced with the Germans. This decision allowed the regrouping and rebuilding of the unit, continuing the fight against the Soviets until the end of June 1944.

In the summer of 1944, the group withdrew from the Naliboki forest and, maneuvering between the shattered German units on the Eastern Front, reached the vicinity of Warsaw. As part of the Kampinos Group, the Naliboki soldiers participated in the Warsaw Uprising, defending Żoliborz and the "Independent Republic of Kampinos." After the defeat at Jaktorów, Dolina and some surviving soldiers crossed the Pilica river and continued fighting the occupier until January 1945.

The Stowbtsy-Naliboki Group was one of the longest-lasting Polish partisan units and the only one to undertake such an extensive combat trail. During its existence, it fought over 230 battles and skirmishes against the Germans, Soviet partisans, and German-collaborating formations. The unit was thrice decimated but managed to regroup each time and continue the fight. Over 19 months, more than 1,950 soldiers passed through the ranks of the group, with around 800 falling in battle or being murdered.

== Origins ==
During the period of the Second Polish Republic, the Stowbtsy District was part of the Nowogródek Voivodeship and was located directly along the state border with the Soviet Union. The Neman river flowed through the district, with the Naliboki forest extending along both of its banks. Dense forests particularly covered the eastern and central parts of the district. Poles made up 52.9% of the district's population, while the second-largest ethnic group were Belarusians (39.1%). After the September 1939 defeat, the Stowbtsy district, along with the rest of the eastern territories, came under Soviet occupation. The first cells of the Polish resistance movement emerged in this area as early as autumn 1939. These were mostly grassroots efforts, usually initiated by Polish youth or the intelligentsia. Many of these organizations were dismantled by the NKVD, but some managed to survive until June 1941. Additionally, in early spring 1940, a partisan unit under the command of Corporal Leonard Dąbrowski (a Border Protection Corps officer and resident of Ivyanyets) was formed in the Naliboki forest. In June 1940, Dąbrowski was killed in a battle with a Soviet sweep operation, and his unit was dispersed. However, small groups of surviving partisans continued to fight in the following months, with at least one group enduring until the end of the first Soviet occupation.

After Germany invaded the Soviet Union in June 1941, the Stowbtsy District was incorporated into the newly created Reichskommissariat Ostland. Supported by Belarusian Auxiliary Police, the Germans exterminated most of the local Jews and imposed ruthless terror on the Polish population. Meanwhile, the Naliboki forest became a refuge for Red Army soldiers who had escaped from German camps or avoided capture after the defeat in the Battle of Białystok–Minsk, as well as for Jews who had fled from nearby ghettos. At the turn of 1942 and 1943, Soviet officers and commissars who had been transferred from behind the front lines began transforming these scattered groups of survivors into regular partisan units. Major General Vasily Y. Chernyshev, codenamed Platon, led the Baranovichi Partisan Group, while Grigory A. Sidorok, codenamed Dubov (the district secretary of the Communist Party of the Soviet Union in Ivyanyets), was the commander of the Ivyanyets inter-district center. By late September 1943, the Baranovichi Group numbered 8,795 partisans, and ten months later, this number had grown to nearly 25,000. The Soviet partisans significantly harassed the local population, mass-requisitioning food, clothing, and other property. Often, these "economic operations" took the form of outright robbery, accompanied by beatings, murders, and rapes of women. The Jewish units of Bielski partisans and Symcha Zorin were particularly ruthless in looting the peasants.

Shortly after the start of the German occupation, the structures of the Union of Armed Struggle (renamed the Home Army in February 1942) began to form in the territories of the former Nowogródek Voivodeship. As early as November 1941, the command of the Nowogródek District of the Home Army appointed Second Lieutenant Aleksander Warakomski, codenamed Świr, as the commander of the Stowbtsy District (codenamed Słup). Świr quickly established contact with the officers and non-commissioned officers of the Polish Armed Forces living in the area. His close collaborator became Reserve Lieutenant Kacper Miłaszewski, codenamed Lewald, one of the leaders of the local Polish community, who also enjoyed relative trust from the Soviet partisans.

Initially, the activities of the Słup District focused on accumulating supplies of weapons and ammunition and infiltrating the local structures of the Belarusian police and administration. The initiative to organize a Polish partisan unit likely emerged in December 1942 but initially did not gain the approval of the Nowogródek District leadership. Over time, factors such as the increasing number of exposed soldiers and the voluntary or forced enlistment of Polish youth into the ranks of the Soviet partisans contributed to a change in the district command's position. They realized that without creating a Polish armed force, it would be impossible to protect the local population from looting and excesses by the formally allied Soviet units. The massacre of the residents of the village of Naliboki by Soviet partisans on the night of 7/8 May 1943 particularly galvanized the decision to organize a partisan unit.

On 3 June 1943, the first recruitment into the ranks of the Polish unit took place at the Kul estate deep in the Naliboki forest. On that day, 44 volunteers reported, becoming the nucleus of the future Stowbtsy-Naliboki Group. The local Home Army leadership initially planned for Second Lieutenant Witold Pełczyński, codenamed Dźwig, to command the unit. However, he was wounded by an accidental grenade explosion on the first day. In these circumstances, Lieutenant Kacper Miłaszewski, codenamed Lewald, took command. News of the formation of the Polish unit quickly spread among the local population. Despite accepting only armed and uniformed volunteers, the unit's strength grew to 130 soldiers within ten days. Shortly afterward, a dozen or so volunteer cavalrymen joined the unit under the leadership of Warrant Officer Zdzisław Nurkiewicz, codenamed Noc, enabling the formation of a mounted patrol.

Given that the Naliboki forest was controlled by a large Soviet partisan group, the formation of a Polish unit would not have been possible without first regulating mutual relations. Initially, the allies demanded that Soviet officers command the unit. They eventually dropped this demand but maintained several other far-reaching conditions, including a prohibition on the unit maintaining contacts with Polish leadership centres in Warsaw and London, a ban on recruiting Poles not from the Nowogródek Voivodeship, tactical subordination of the unit to Soviet command, and the freedom to spread communist propaganda among the soldiers. With the Nowogródek District command's consent, Polish negotiators accepted all Soviet conditions without intending to adhere to them in practice. Furthermore, the Polish delegates effectively concealed their organizational affiliation, leaving the Soviet command unaware until September 1943 that the unit was part of the Home Army and believing it had been formed solely by local Poles.

The details of the cooperation were agreed upon a few days after the unit's formation. The Naliboki forest was divided into Polish and Soviet sectors, where partisans from the other side could not move without valid passes. It was agreed that Polish and Soviet partisans would procure supplies respectively on the western and eastern sides of the 1939 border. (Note: This territorial division did not apply to estates and warehouses under German administration, nor did it apply in emergency situations – such as a German blockade (Podgóreczny (2010a, p. 28, vol. I)).) The Soviet side promised to agitate the Polish population residing or sheltering in their controlled area to join the Polish unit. Even the unit's name became a matter of negotiation, as the Soviets demanded it be named after Wanda Wasilewska or Felix Dzerzhinsky. Ultimately, they settled on the compromise name Tadeusz Kościuszko Polish Partisan Unit.

=== Name of the group ===
The partisan group of the Home Army formed based on the Słup District (Note: Due to the reorganization of the Nowogródek District of the Home Army at the beginning of 1943, the districts were transformed into centers that could be diversionary, partisan, or both, depending on the needs. The Stowbtsy Center was categorized as both a partisan and diversionary center (Krajewski (2006, p. 100)).) was called the Stowbtsy Group. The name Stowbtsy-Naliboki Group, which is most frequently found in the literature, emerged only after the war and was not used during the unit's existence.

In the Nowogródek structures of the Home Army, the group was usually referred to as the Polish Partisan Unit. In official district documents, the codenames battalion from 'Słup' or battalion no. 330 were also used. In correspondence with the Soviet partisans, the agreed-upon name Tadeusz Kościuszko Polish Partisan Unit or simply Tadeusz Kościuszko Battalion was used.

During the fighting in the Naliboki forest, soldiers of the Stowbtsy Group were commonly referred to as legionnaires. This term was used by the Germans, Soviet partisans, and the local Polish and Belarusian population. After the war, referring to the pseudonym of the group's most famous commander, Lieutenant Adolf Pilch, codenamed Dolina, the informal name Doliniacy was also used.

== Fighting in Naliboki forest ==
=== Ivyanyets Uprising ===
A few days after the formation of the unit, the Polish command decided to launch an attack on Ivyanyets. This town, elevated during the occupation to the status of a raion capital, was defended by a strong garrison consisting of between 500 and 700 Germans and Belarusian policemen. The aim of the attack was to free the arrested members of the local resistance network and pre-empt a similar Soviet action. After obtaining approval from the district command, the operation was scheduled for 22 June 1943. However, Polish intelligence soon learned that the Germans had ordered a mass conscription into the Belarusian Self-Defense Corps and a requisition of horses for the German army on June 19. This presented an excellent opportunity to covertly smuggle armed partisans into the town, leading to the decision to advance the operation by three days. The Polish plans envisaged attacking Ivyanyets both from within and from the outside.

The attack on Ivyanyets, historically known as the Ivyanyets Uprising, began at noon on June 19. In the first phase of the operation, the Polish partisans cut off telephone communication and easily took control of the post office and the economic office. The Belarusian policemen, many of whom were covert members of the Home Army, surrendered relatively quickly. The German gendarmes, however, put up fierce resistance for over two hours, which was only broken by setting the gendarmerie building on fire. Meanwhile, Polish partisans managed to effectively engage two companies of the Luftwaffe stationed in barracks by the Wołma river. Ivyanyets remained free for nearly 18 hours, with Polish soldiers evacuating the town at 6:00 AM on June 20.

The "uprising" ended in complete success. For the loss of three dead and from 6 to 11 wounded, the Polish partisans killed between several dozen to 150 Germans and freed all prisoners, including some Jews. Between 100 and 200 Belarusian policemen joined the Polish unit. The partisans also captured large quantities of weapons, ammunition, food, and other supplies. According to Kazimierz Krajewski, the capture of Ivyanyets was one of the largest armed actions in the history of the Home Army.

== Formation of the Stowbtsy battalion ==
The victory at Ivyanyets allowed the Polish unit to increase its numbers to approximately 300 soldiers. Within the following two weeks, this number nearly doubled. Reports indicate that on the eve of the pacification of Naliboki forest, the Polish unit numbered 554 soldiers. Other sources estimate its strength at between 600 and 650 partisans. This growth in numbers enabled the unit to transform into a partisan battalion. By the summer of 1943, its organizational structure was as follows:

- 1st Company, commanded by cadet officer Olgierd Woyno, codenamed Lech, primarily comprised volunteers from the Polish youth of Ivyanyets and its surroundings;
- 2nd Company, commanded by Lieutenant Jarosław Gąsiewski, codenamed Jar, primarily consisted of reserve soldiers (many were veterans of the September Campaign) and Polish youth from the areas around Derewno and Naliboki;
- 3rd Company, commanded by Staff Sergeant Stefan Poznański, codenamed Szary, primarily included deserters from the Belarusian auxiliary police;
- cavalry reconnaissance, led by Warrant Officer Zdzisław Nurkiewicz, codenamed Noc, with about 15 lancers;
- gendarmerie patrol, commanded by Corporal Cadet Jan Bryczkowski, codenamed Zew;
- communications patrol, commanded by Corporal Jan Misiaczek, codenamed Miś;
- engineer patrol, commanded by Corporal Alojzy Drożniewski.

The battalion's ranks included soldiers of both Polish and Belarusian nationalities. Additionally, several Jews served in the rear units, although Lieutenant Lewald, remembering the stance of the local Jewish population during the Soviet occupation, agreed to accept only Jews from western or central Poland into the unit. Marian Podgóreczny estimated that the battalion's arsenal at that time included: 4 heavy machine guns, 15 light machine guns, 30 submachine guns, approximately 100 ten-shot rifles, about 400 rifles, over 100 pistols and revolvers, several thousand grenades, and tens of thousands of rounds of ammunition. Kazimierz Krajewski estimated that on the eve of the pacification of Naliboki forest, the Polish unit had 6 heavy machine guns, 27 light machine guns, 19 submachine guns, 58 ten-shot rifles, 405 rifles, and 105 handguns.

After retreating from Ivyanyets, the Polish unit stopped in Rudnia Nalibocka, where the aforementioned reorganization was carried out. Upon completion, the battalion moved to the southern part of Naliboki forest, around the village of Bielica and the Drywiezna forest glade. There, they began organizing partisan camps, stockpiling food and clothing, and constructing bunkers and makeshift stables. Lieutenant Lewald also ordered intensive training for the volunteers. Within less than a week, the Polish partisans eliminated Belarusian police posts in Starzyń and Kisłuchy (June 28), Derewno and Wołma (June 30), and Zasula and Rubieżewicze (July 3). They were also preparing an attack on the German garrison in Mir. Relations with the Soviet partisans were amicable during this period. On July 7, soldiers of the 1st Company, along with a group of Soviet partisans, successfully ambushed a column of German vehicles near Wołma, destroying from 5 to 6 vehicles and killing several dozen Germans.

=== Operation Hermann ===
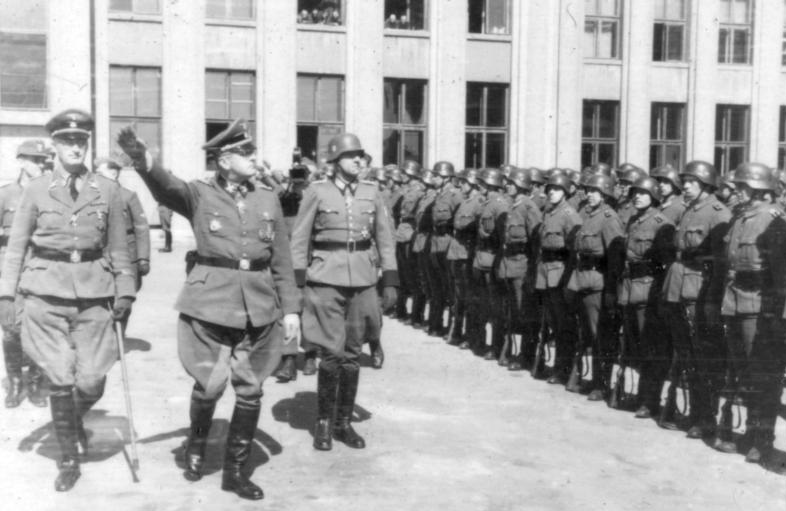
Erich von dem Bach-Zelewski and Curt von Gottberg reviewing an Ordnungspolizei parade in Lenin Square, Minsk

The Ivyanyets Uprising resonated throughout the Nowogródek Voivodeship and greatly alarmed the German command. The occupiers resolved to eliminate the partisan bases in the Naliboki forest at all costs. To this end, they assembled a significant force, numbering up to 60,000 soldiers and policemen, supported by aviation, artillery, and armored units. The anti-partisan operation, codenamed Hermann, was personally led by the SS and Police Leader in Belarus, SS-Brigadeführer Curt von Gottberg. His staff was joined by SS-Obergruppenführer Erich von dem Bach-Zelewski, the Reichsführer's special representative for combating partisans.

Operation Hermann began on July 13, with the first clashes occurring on the morning of July 20 (Kazimierz Krajewski notes July 15). According to prior arrangements, Polish and Soviet partisans jointly attempted to resist the pacification effort. Initially, the Home Army soldiers effectively defended the Minsk–Novogrudok route passing through the forest and the crossings on the Szura river. On the first day of fighting, they inflicted significant losses on the Germans, killing up to 50. However, on the second day, the Polish command was surprised to discover that the Soviet units, tasked with covering both flanks of the Polish battalion, had abandoned their defensive positions without warning. Years later, some Polish historians and veterans speculated that the Soviets intended to destroy the Polish unit using German hands, deliberately exposing its flanks. However, surviving Soviet documents indicate that under German pressure, a larger part of the Dubov Group panicked and dispersed.

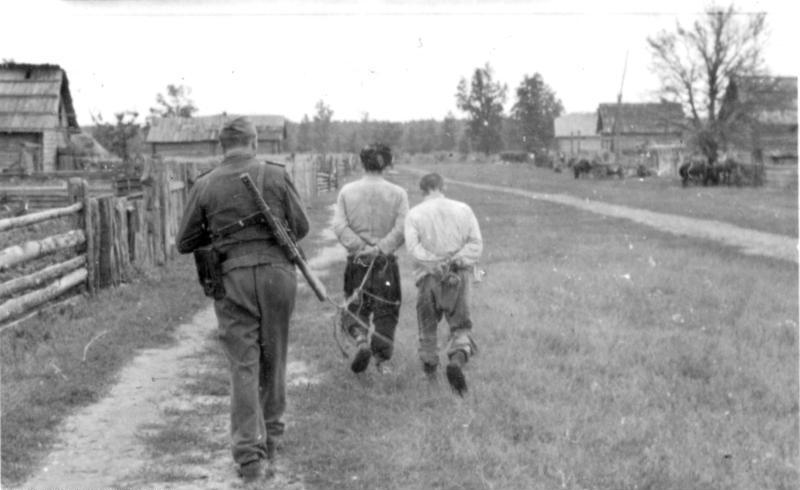
Partisans captured by the Germans during Operation Hermann

Threatened with encirclement, the Home Army battalion was forced to retreat deeper into the forest. Initially, the Polish partisans successfully evaded the German dragnet, although they had to abandon most of their transport during the crossing of the Shubin-German canal. Soon, the unit was pushed into the most inaccessible part of the Naliboki forest, known as the Bare Swamps. With the encirclement tightening and no possibility of continuing open combat, the Polish command was compelled to split the battalion into small groups of from 20 to 25 soldiers and order them to find safety on their own. Most partisans managed to escape the dragnet, but many were killed or captured. Soviet brigades managed to break through to the vicinity of Minsk but suffered heavy losses in the process.

The blockade of the Naliboki forest ended on August 8. The Polish battalion suffered losses of at least 40 killed, several dozen wounded, and over 100 missing. Among the fallen and murdered were the commander of the 1st Company, Cadet Officer Lech, and the commander of the 3rd Company, Staff Sergeant Szary. The latter company, composed mainly of deserters from the Belarusian auxiliary police, suffered the heaviest losses, as many of its soldiers, having escaped encirclement, chose not to return to the partisans. The battalion lost nearly 60% of its weapons, including all heavy machine guns and mortars, as well as its transport and most of its horses. The greatest victims of Operation Hermann, however, were the civilian population. To deprive the partisans of support, the Germans created a "scorched earth" zone within a radius of between 10 and 15 kilometers around the forest. They completely destroyed 60 villages and an undetermined number of individual farmsteads and forester's lodges, killing 4,280 people. Between 21,000 and 25,000 people were sent for forced labor to the Third Reich. The elderly, women, and children were resettled outside the blockade zone.

=== Rebuilding the unit ===
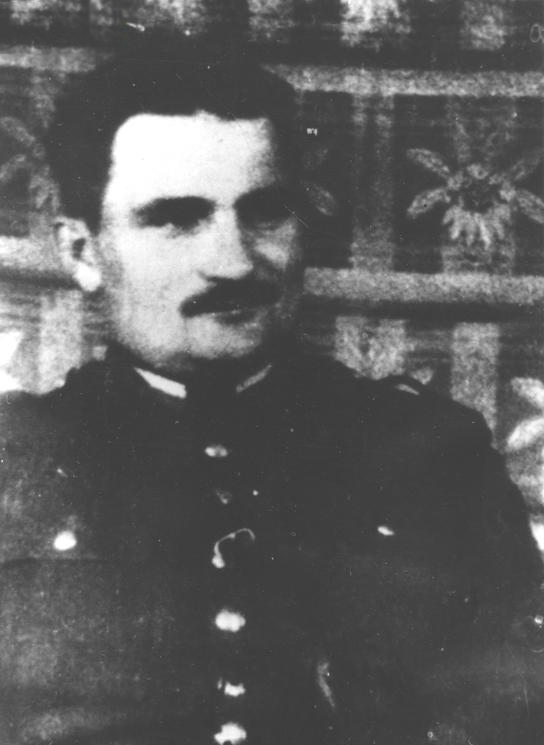
Adolf Pilch, codenamed Góra/Dolina, the most famous commander of the Stowbtsy Group

After the blockade ended, the Polish battalion regrouped around Drywiezna. The soldiers were exhausted from previous battles and were suffering from a severe lack of weapons, food, clothing, and equipment. Due to the lack of radio communication and the peripheral location of the Stowbtsy Center, contact with the district headquarters in Lida was irregular, causing a sense of isolation among the soldiers. Under these circumstances, the morale within the unit was low, with instances of desertion occurring. Nevertheless, the unit was in the process of rebuilding, and volunteers continued to join. Shortly after the blockade ended, a 30-man Home Army detachment from the Molodechno District, led by Cadet Officer Andrzej Kutzner, codenamed Mały, joined the battalion.

Meanwhile, the district command decided to strengthen the battalion's leadership with a few Silent Unseen paratroopers sent from the United Kingdom. At the end of August, Lieutenant Lech Rydzewski, codenamed Grom, joined the unit, followed on September 6 by Lieutenant Ezechiel Łoś, codenamed Ikwa, and Second Lieutenant Adolf Pilch, codenamed Góra. The commander of the Słup Center, Lieutenant Świr, instructed Góra to take command of the battalion. Initially, Góra resisted, citing his low rank and unfamiliarity with local conditions. He relented only when Świr agreed to consider his appointment temporary and promised to request an officer with appropriate qualifications from the district command to take over the battalion. Lieutenant Lewald, who had been commanding the unit, was appointed "officer for special assignments", with his main task being to represent the group in contacts with Soviet partisans.

The arrival of the Silent Unseen significantly boosted the battalion's morale. By the end of November, the number of soldiers had risen to about 400. In September and October, the Polish partisans carried out several successful combat operations against the Germans and their Belarusian collaborators. (Note: Among the combat actions carried out by the Polish partisan unit in September and October 1943, the following can be mentioned: the rout of a roughly 20-man unit of German gendarmerie near Rubieżewicze, the elimination of a 12-man guard detail at a mill in Derewno, the burning of German grain warehouses in Nowy Dwór, the disarmament of a Belarusian police post in Chotowo, the derailment of two trains on the Stowbtsy–Baranavichy and Stowbtsy–Niegorełoje lines, the execution of several smaller diversionary actions in Ivyanyets, the killing and wounding of 17 Germans in an ambush near Jeremicze, and a skirmish with a Wehrmacht unit near Żołnierkiewicze. Boradyn (2013, p. 145) claimed that the Polish partisans, together with the Soviet Kurhanov's unit, also attacked the post in Zasul, although this is not confirmed by other Polish sources (Podgóreczny (2010b, pp. 35–36)).) Concurrently, Góra reorganized the battalion. The existing infantry sub-units were restructured into the 1st Assault Company under Second Lieutenant Ikwa and the 2nd Sabotage-Diversion Company under Lieutenant Grom. A new agreement was also reached with the Ivyanyets group of Soviet partisans, under which both sides pledged not to requisition from civilians in the forest-adjacent zone and within a 20-kilometer radius around the Naliboki forest. Preparations began for joint raids on German garrisons in Mir, Starzyna, and Zasula, which ultimately did not materialize. Additionally, Polish partisans established contacts with Alsatians conscripted into the Wehrmacht, who were guarding a section of the Brest–Minsk railway line near Kołosowo. Negotiations led to an agreement for the Alsatians to desert the German army and join the Polish group. However, the agreement was not executed, as the Germans relocated the Alsatians to the Minsk area almost at the last minute. Lieutenant Ikwa's company, tasked with facilitating their desertion by conducting sabotage on the railway, fell into a German ambush and avoided serious losses only thanks to the commander's alertness. Home Army intelligence later determined that Soviet partisans had informed the Germans of the planned action.

Between June 3 and November 30, 1943, the Polish partisan unit fought between 40 and 52 battles against the Germans and their Belarusian collaborators, destroying three bridges and derailing three trains. Approximately 200 AK soldiers were killed or murdered in the fight against the German occupiers. (Note: The list of soldiers of the Stowbtsy-Naliboki Group of the Home Army includes data on 204 soldiers who were killed, murdered, or went missing in action against the Germans and their collaborators in the Nowogródek Voivodeship. However, this compilation covers the period from 27 May 1943 to 26 July 1944, and thus also includes those several members of the group who died after the truce with the Germans or during the evacuation from the Eastern Borderlands (Grzybowski (2014, p. 15)).)

On November 6, additional officers from Warsaw arrived at the Polish camp: Major Wacław Pełka, codenamed Wacław, Second Lieutenant Julian Bobrownicki, codenamed Klin, Second Lieutenant Maciej Rzewuski, codenamed Zator, and Cadet Officer Józef Borkowski, codenamed Junosza. With the authority of the district command, Major Pełka took command of the battalion, with Second Lieutenant Góra serving as his deputy. Lieutenant Klin was appointed officer for educational and informational matters. Wacław was an experienced soldier but, as a pre-war staff officer, he had significant difficulties adapting to the specifics of partisan warfare. In particular, he alienated the soldiers with his excessive adherence to regulations and barracks discipline. Additionally, in dealings with Soviet officers, the new commander showed a lack of diplomatic skills.

=== Conflict with Soviet partisans ===
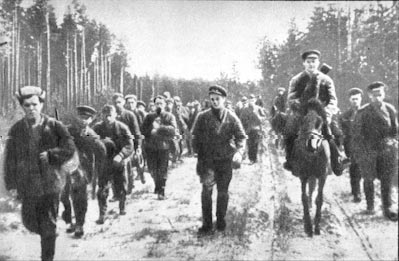
Soviet partisans in Belarus

Despite various minor incidents, relations between the Polish and Soviet partisans had been generally amicable for a long time. However, by the end of October, these relations began to deteriorate. Soviet "whispering propaganda" claimed that the Silent Unseen were actually British spies sent to the Eastern Borderlands with the mission of conducting anti-Soviet activities. Polish soldiers, and even officers, were being persuaded to desert and join the Soviet partisans (Ensign Noc and Sergeant Major Dąb were explicitly encouraged to eliminate their group's commander). Contrary to previous agreements, one Soviet unit incorporated a group of Czechs from the Organization Todt who had defected intending to join the Polish unit. Conversely, the Polish command refused to hand over two Kashubians who, after deserting from the Wehrmacht, had joined the Soviet partisans but then fled to the Polish unit. The Soviet side also reacted very negatively to the celebration of Polish Independence Day organized by the Polish unit in Derewno, as during the ceremony, Lieutenant Świr delivered a speech unequivocally affirming the Eastern Borderlands' belonging to Poland.

A serious incident occurred in the second half of November. On the night of November 17/18, Polish horse reconnaissance received information that Jews were looting in the village of Sobkowszczyzna. Ensign Noc immediately mobilized his soldiers and drove the attackers, who turned out to be Soviet partisans from Symcha Zorin's unit (composed mainly of Jews), out of the village. Shortly afterward, ten of Zorin's men arrived at Noc's headquarters in Dubniki, demanding the return of their horses and wagons taken by the Polish cavalry. In response, Noc ordered the disarmament of the visitors and their return the next day to their parent unit (to be punished for unauthorized requisition). However, the Home Army soldiers assigned to escort the detainees disobeyed the order and unilaterally executed all of Zorin's men. A few days later, the Soviet command demanded the extradition of Ensign Nurkiewicz from Major Wacław. Ultimately, however, a bilateral commission was appointed to thoroughly investigate the incident's circumstances. The investigation conducted by this commission was closed due to the inability to identify either the perpetrators of the murders or the bodies of the victims.

Due to the deteriorating relations with their allies, the intelligence and counterintelligence of the Stowbtsy Battalion had to start operating against the Soviets as well. Fearing that such operations might openly antagonize the Soviets, Lieutenant Lewald led to the formation of a so-called Wołma Platoon under the command of Corporal Antoni Jankowski. This subunit pretended to be an independent unit, and its main task was to observe the actions of the Soviet partisans and counter any potential anti-Polish actions from their side.

==== Disarming of the unit ====
At the end of November, the commander of the Ivyanyets group, Colonel Grigoriy Sidorok, codenamed Dubov, contacted the command of the Polish battalion, announcing that he would appear at the Polish camp on December 1 to address the soldiers. Dubov expected the Poles to concentrate all their units in the main camp at Drywieźno, thus enabling him to speak to as many partisans as possible. Contrary to the warnings of Lieutenant Góra, Major Wacław decided to fulfill all the Soviet colonel's wishes. Units in the field were ordered to return to the camp by dawn on December 1 at the latest. On the day before the announced visit (according to other sources, on November 27), another Soviet liaison appeared in the Polish camp, bringing an invitation for the staff and commanders of the Polish units to a war council organized by Dubov. The briefing, supposedly in connection with German preparations for another anti-partisan operation, was scheduled for November 30. However, since this date coincided with the name day of several officers, Wacław decided that the Polish delegation would set out for the Soviet headquarters early on December 1.

On December 1 at 6:00 AM, a delegation from Drywieźno departed, consisting of Major Wacław, Lieutenant Lewald, Lieutenant Ikwa, Second Lieutenant Zator, Second Lieutenant Klin, Second Lieutenant Waldan (Walenty Parchimowicz, security officer), Cadet Junosza, as well as several other officers and a dozen or so soldiers as escort. Shortly after leaving the camp, the delegation was unexpectedly surrounded by a strong unit of Soviet partisans. All the Poles were disarmed and then escorted to Dubov's headquarters. Almost simultaneously, Dubov's units began disarming the officer-less units. The camp in Drywieźno and Grom's 2nd company quartered a little over a kilometer away were attacked by several thousand Soviet partisans from the Stalin and Frunze brigades. Completely surprised, the Home Army soldiers mostly did not resist. Between 150 and 160 officers, non-commissioned officers, and enlisted men fell into the hands of the attackers. Among them were Lieutenant Grom and Lieutenant Świr (visiting the partisan camp that day). Earlier, Second Lieutenant Góra, having gathered several dozen soldiers, attempted to organize a counterattack but had to lay down arms when the Soviets threatened to execute the prisoners taken in the camp. That morning, only about a 20-member Dąb Group from the Maladzyechna District, to which Second Lieutenant Góra also managed to join, avoided disarmament from the units quartered in the Drywieźno area. (Note: After the failed counterattack attempt, Dąb Group did not surrender but took up defensive positions on the edge of a forest located near the camp. The Soviet command then sent two disarmed Home Army soldiers to the Maladzyechna group, instructing them to persuade their comrades to capitulate. Taking advantage of the chaos in the camp, Lieutenant Góra managed to discreetly join the emissaries, thereby avoiding captivity (Pilch (2013, pp. 129–130)).) Meanwhile, the Chapaev unit from the Stalin Brigade struck the village of Derewno, where the 1st company of Lieutenant Ikwa had stopped. Ten Polish soldiers were killed on the spot, eight were wounded, and the rest were disarmed. Soviet losses were limited to two wounded. Over the next ten days, Soviet partisans also captured seventeen members of the Wołma Platoon (due to leaves, they were individually deployed in nearby villages).

Captured Home Army soldiers were taken to Soviet bases deep in the Naliboki forest. Ten officers and organizers of the Polish unit were placed separately in strictly guarded dugouts and subjected to intensive interrogation. After the investigation, the investigative group appointed by General Platon filed a motion to execute all ten prisoners. Eventually, at the demand of Panteleimon Ponomarenko, head of the Central Headquarters of the Partisan Movement, Wacław, Lewald, Klin, Grom, and Ikwa were transported by air to the other side of the front on the night of 13/14 January 1944. They were all imprisoned in Moscow's Lubyanka, then sent to Gulags, from which they managed to return only in 1948. (Note: During the interrogations conducted at Lubyanka, Lieutenant Miłaszewski was offered the opportunity to recreate a Polish partisan unit. This unit was to operate in the Nowogródek Voivodeship and be strictly subordinated to the Central Staff of the Partisan Movement. Lewald rejected all Soviet proposals, resulting in his imprisonment in a labor camp (Podgóreczny (2010a, p. 107, vol.I)).) The remaining five accused – Waldan, Zator, Cadet Tadeusz Migacz, codenamed Mita, Senior Sergeant Sergiusz Howorka, codenamed Jaszczołd, and Corporal Władysław Skrodzki, codenamed Jan – were executed. In total, the Soviets killed between 30 and 50 abducted soldiers. Among the victims, besides the aforementioned officers, were Cadet Junosza, Corporal Antoni Jankowski, Second Lieutenant Michał Meisner, codenamed Mazur, Second Lieutenant Witold Kryński, codenamed Sibisz, and Lieutenant Ludwik Wierszyłowski, codenamed Ludek. The remaining Poles were incorporated into various Soviet units in groups of 3 or 4 and subjected to close surveillance. General Płaton stated in the letter to Colonel Dubov on 1/2 December 1943:

Comrade 'Dubov'. You conducted the operation excellently. That's very good. I expected it couldn't be executed without a major bloodshed (…). Take the Poles into the units and keep them in groups (without weapons for now) under the command of our commanders. Some should be recruited and sent home. Scoundrels, especially policemen, landowners, settlers, shoot, but quietly so no one knows.

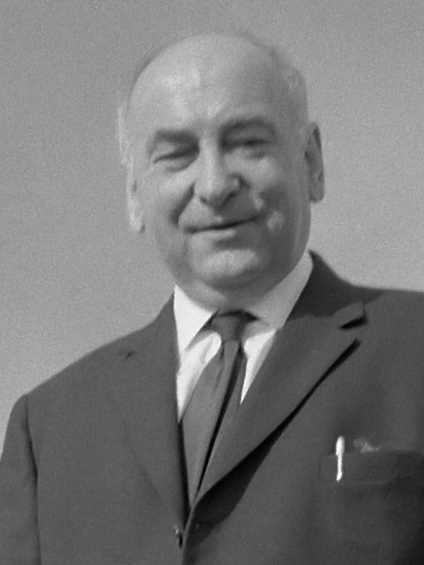
Panteleimon Ponomarenko, head of the Central Headquarters of the Partisan Movement, first secretary of the Central Committee of the Communist Party of Belarus

Before the disarmament of the battalion, Ensign Noc, who had been receiving vague rumors of the Soviets' aggressive intentions for some time, managed to obtain permission to lead his cavalry squadron "into the field". Upon hearing of the Soviet attack, the ensign immediately directed his unit to Derewno, but the cavalrymen arrived too late to save the infantrymen of Ikwa's company. Learning about the disarmament of nearly the entire group, Noc ordered a retreat to the village of Pażdzierno near Rubieżewicze. The cavalrymen, engaging in minor skirmishes with Soviet partisans along the way, reached their destination on the evening of December 1. Within a day, Noc's uhlans managed to capture between 70 and 120 Soviet partisans, who were released after being disarmed. A captured lieutenant named Feoktistov was found with a secret order in which the command of the Stalin Brigade, acting on behalf of the head of the Central Headquarters of the Partisan Movement, instructed their subunit commanders and commissars to disarm the "Polish legionaries". Thus, the hopes that the surprise attack was solely the initiative of local Soviet commanders proved futile. The acquired document was forwarded to the headquarters of the Nowogródek District of the Home Army, which then sent it to the Home Army Main Headquarters, which relayed it via radio to the Polish authorities in London. In unexplained circumstances, the order also fell into German hands, who later used it in a distorted form in propaganda directed at the Polish population.

On December 3, after a strenuous march through the Islach marshes, the Maladzyechna group led by Second Lieutenant Góra reached the village of Osowo, where they joined Noc's squadron. The next day, the Maladzyechna group decided to leave the threatened area and move to the Vilnius Region. Cadet Mały, commanding the Dąb Group, suggested to Góra and Noc that they, along with the remnants of their group, should set out with him. However, the soldiers from the Stowbtsy Center, whose number had dwindled to just 60, unanimously chose to remain in the Naliboki forest. Soon the Polish detachment received information that Soviet partisans from the Frunze Brigade were quartered in the village of Kul. Ensign Nurkiewicz then proposed capturing the Soviet unit's command and then exchanging the prisoners for the abducted Polish officers. In a surprise raid, the Poles managed to disarm a significantly larger enemy unit (killing several Soviets in the fight). The main goal of the action was not achieved, as the brigade commander Major Seweryn Kluczko managed to escape from the village. However, the victory over a stronger opponent improved the morale of the detachment. In revenge for the defeat, the Soviets murdered seventeen peasants from Kul the next day. They also executed seven of their comrades, accused of dereliction of duty.

==== Armistice with the Germans ====
In the first days of December, members of the Home Army embedded in the Belarusian police provided assistance to the Polish partisans. However, this support was temporary and could not change the difficult situation of the unit in the long run. On December 7, soldiers under Góra were attacked in the village of Kunasze by a strong detachment of Soviet partisans. Most of the ammunition was used up in this clash. The number of soldiers decreased to 42 due to losses and the desertion of 16 lancers (12 of whom were later re-enlisted). The soldiers were exhausted from constant escape and almost daily skirmishes, lacking ammunition and essential equipment. Thousands of Soviet partisans were consistently pushing the Poles into territories controlled by the Germans.

The Germans quickly learned of the Polish-Soviet conflict. Soon, through the Polish population, they began sending signals indicating their willingness to conclude a "non-aggression pact" with the Home Army unit. Seeing no alternative, Góra decided, with the consent of the remaining officers, to approach the gendarmerie command in Ivyanyets with a proposal for an armistice. Talks took place on December 9 near the village of Kulczyce. The Germans proposed that the Polish partisans come under their command, which was firmly refused. Góra also rejected the German offer of assistance in case of a Soviet attack. Ultimately, an agreement was reached that both sides would maintain mutual neutrality. The Germans agreed to place a small area about 4 km from Ivyanyets under the control of the Home Army soldiers. Additionally, they provided the Poles with several thousand rounds of ammunition and promised to supply more arms and ammunition in exchange for food deliveries.

The agreement was approved by the command of the Nowogródek District of the Home Army. However, news of Góra's contacts with the Germans was met with a very negative reaction from the Home Army Main Command and the Polish government-in-exile. Both General Tadeusz Komorowski, codenamed Bór, and General Kazimierz Sosnkowski demanded the severance of all relations with the Germans. Given the political and military situation in Nowogródek region, following these orders would have meant the destruction of the Stowbtsy Group and the dismantling of the local underground network. For this reason, the commander of the Nowogródek District, Lieutenant Colonel Janusz Prawdzic-Szlaski, took it upon himself to instruct Góra to continue contacts with the Germans, only prohibiting any written agreements. Ultimately, his actions were tacitly approved by the Home Army Main Command.

Initially, it was assumed that the truce would last no more than a few days, but it actually remained in effect until almost the end of June 1944. In the short term, the agreement proved beneficial for both sides. After 1 December 1943, Soviet partisans in the Naliboki forest focused on fighting the Home Army, practically giving up more serious actions against the Germans. Meanwhile, by concluding the truce with the Germans, Góra gained the necessary time and resources to rebuild the unit shattered by the Soviets. Upon learning that the Polish group had not been annihilated and was still fighting, 75 to 150 abducted soldiers escaped from the Soviet units over the next few months. New volunteers also continued to join the unit. By mid-January 1944, Góra's group had 106 soldiers. By early February, this number had risen to 157, and by April, the group's strength had increased to 446 partisans.

Marian Podgóreczny claimed that the Germans were very reluctant to provide Góra's unit with arms and ammunition, and after December 9, only one effective transport of German rifles, grenades, and ammunition from Minsk was completed. However, reports sent by Góra to the district command indicate that by 26 March 1944, his unit had received from the Germans 4 mortars with 280 shells, 4 heavy machine guns, 9 light machine guns, 193 rifles, 100,500 rounds of ammunition, and 500 grenades. Between April 1 and May 25, 1944, the Germans supplied the Stowbtsy Group with 3 heavy machine guns, 5 light machine guns, 7 light machine guns, 181 rifles, 110,000 rounds of ammunition, 522 hand grenades, and 148 mortar shells. The Germans provided the Poles with weapons and ammunition of various origins (Russian, French, Dutch, Belgian, Italian), likely intending to make them dependent on their supplies. There was also one instance where a Home Army soldier wounded in a fight with the Soviets (previously a Belarusian policeman) received medical assistance in a German hospital.

The Polish-German agreement was verbal, and in practice, both sides treated each other with distrust and assumed from the beginning that it was temporary. Góra prohibited his soldiers from maintaining any contacts with the Germans and their Belarusian collaborators without the command's consent. Anti-German actions were not completely abandoned. On Góra's orders, Judge Karaczun from Stowbtsy (a terror to the local Polish population) and the head of the commune in Świerżeń Nowy were eliminated. There was also an incident where the lancers of Noc repelled a German punitive expedition intending to pacify a Polish farm. The Gestapo continued to hunt down volunteers intending to join the Stowbtsy Group, and an order from the Belarusian starosta of Stowbtsy offering a monetary reward for capturing any "legionary" was never revoked. In German documents, the Polish unit was consistently referred to as "Góra's band". Authors of a secret Abwehr report dated 26 April 1944 prepared for the Army Group Centre staff, assessed that the Home Army units of Góra and Ragner would sooner or later engage in combat with the Germans, and that a truce with them would bring more harm than temporary benefit to the Wehrmacht.

==== Fight against Soviet partisans ====
Meanwhile, a regular Polish-Soviet partisan war erupted along the Niemen river. Dubov's units attempted to destroy the Stowbtsy Group while terrorizing the Polish civilian population. Families of Polish partisans and individuals suspected of collaborating with the Home Army were murdered. Due to the clear disparity in forces and orders from the district command, Góra's group adopted a defensive stance in this conflict, focusing on self-defense, maintaining their presence in the area, and protecting the Polish population from the terror of the Soviet partisans. Later, whenever possible, ambushes were set up against Soviet units or small raids were conducted into enemy territory. In an effort to gain sympathy and support from local peasants, Home Army soldiers sought to obtain food primarily from collective farms located east of the pre-war border. Often, they also obtained supplies at the expense of families of local Soviet partisans. Incidents occurred where in response to the terror perpetrated by Dubov's group, Polish units carried out retaliatory reprisals against families and collaborators of Soviet partisans.

Depending on the sources, it is estimated that by the end of June 1944, the soldiers of Góra engaged in 104, over 120, or even more than 160 skirmishes with Soviet partisans. Despite the enemy's clear numerical and armament advantage, the Stowbtsy Group usually emerged defensively from these clashes. This is evidenced by the fact that as a result of the fights between 1 December 1943 and 1 January 1944, Soviet partisans lost approximately 150 killed and around 120 captured and disarmed, while Polish losses amounted to a dozen killed. Kazimierz Krajewski estimated that by the end of June 1944, Góra's group had killed around 600 Soviet partisans, while suffering ten times fewer losses. (Note: Estimates regarding Polish losses provided by Podgóreczny (2010a, p. 108, vol. I) and Krajewski (2006, p. 101) do not include soldiers abducted or killed during the Soviet raid on 1 December 1943. They also do not cover members of the local Home Army network killed and casualties among the Polish civilian population. Grzybowski (2014, p. 23) calculated that in the fight against Soviet partisans, 85 soldiers of the Stowbtsy-Naliboki Group were killed, 140 were murdered, and one went missing. His compilation takes into account the casualties from the assault on 1 December 1943.)

One of the most serious clashes between Polish and Soviet partisans occurred on the night of 13/14 May 1944 in Kamień near Iwieniec. The village, where between 100 and 120 Polish infantrymen from the 1st company were stationed, was attacked by between 700 and 800 Soviet partisans. After a fierce several-hour battle, the attackers were close to victory, but the arrival of Polish reinforcements forced them into a hasty retreat. Both sides suffered serious losses in this skirmish. Between 16 and 21 Polish partisans, including the company commander, Sergeant Józef Zujewski, codenamed Mak, were killed, and another 23 soldiers were wounded. Additionally, 20 residents of Kamień were killed, and the village itself was partially burned down. Soviet losses were estimated at 80 killed and wounded. After this battle, Dubov's units did not undertake any more significant offensive actions against the Polish group.

=== Preparations for Operation Tempest ===
Due to the steady increase in the number of partisans, Góra was able to conduct a reorganization of the group by the end of February. The cavalry reconnaissance squadron led by Warrant Officer Noc was transformed into a cavalry squadron, while the infantry was formed into a battalion under the command of Second Lieutenant Witold Pełczyński, codenamed Dźwig. In April, by decision of the district command, the infantry unit was officially named the 1st Battalion of the 78th Słuck Infantry Riflemen Regiment, while the cavalry unit was named the 1st Squadron of the 27th Uhlan Regiment. At the same time, the district command reassigned several officers to the Stowbtsy Group to fill vacant command positions. Among those who joined the group were Lieutenant Jerzy Piestrzyński, codenamed Helski, Second Lieutenant Franciszek Baumgart, codenamed Dan, Second Lieutenant Witold Lenczewski, codenamed Strzała, and Second Lieutenant Mikołaj Stecki, codenamed Nowina. Additionally, Dr. Antoni Banis, codenamed Kleszczyk, reported to Lieutenant Góra and organized a field hospital based in Giliki.

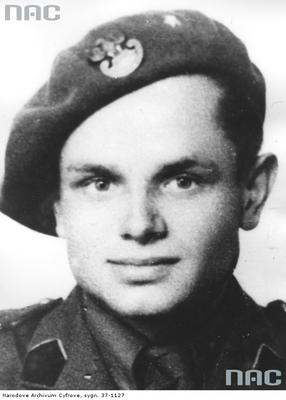
Franciszek Rybka, codenamed Kula, the last commander of the Słup Center, deputy commander of the Stowbtsy Group

Personnel changes also affected the leadership of the Słup Center. On 1 December 1943, the commander of the center, Lieutenant Świr, was abducted by Soviet partisans, but he managed to escape from the prisoner column the same day. However, the district command deemed him compromised and transferred him to the position of commander of the Bór Center in Lida. Lieutenant Franciszek Rybka, codenamed Kula, was appointed as the commander of the Stowbtsy Center. In April 1944, he left Stowbtsy and joined Góra's units, where he assumed the position of deputy commander of the group.

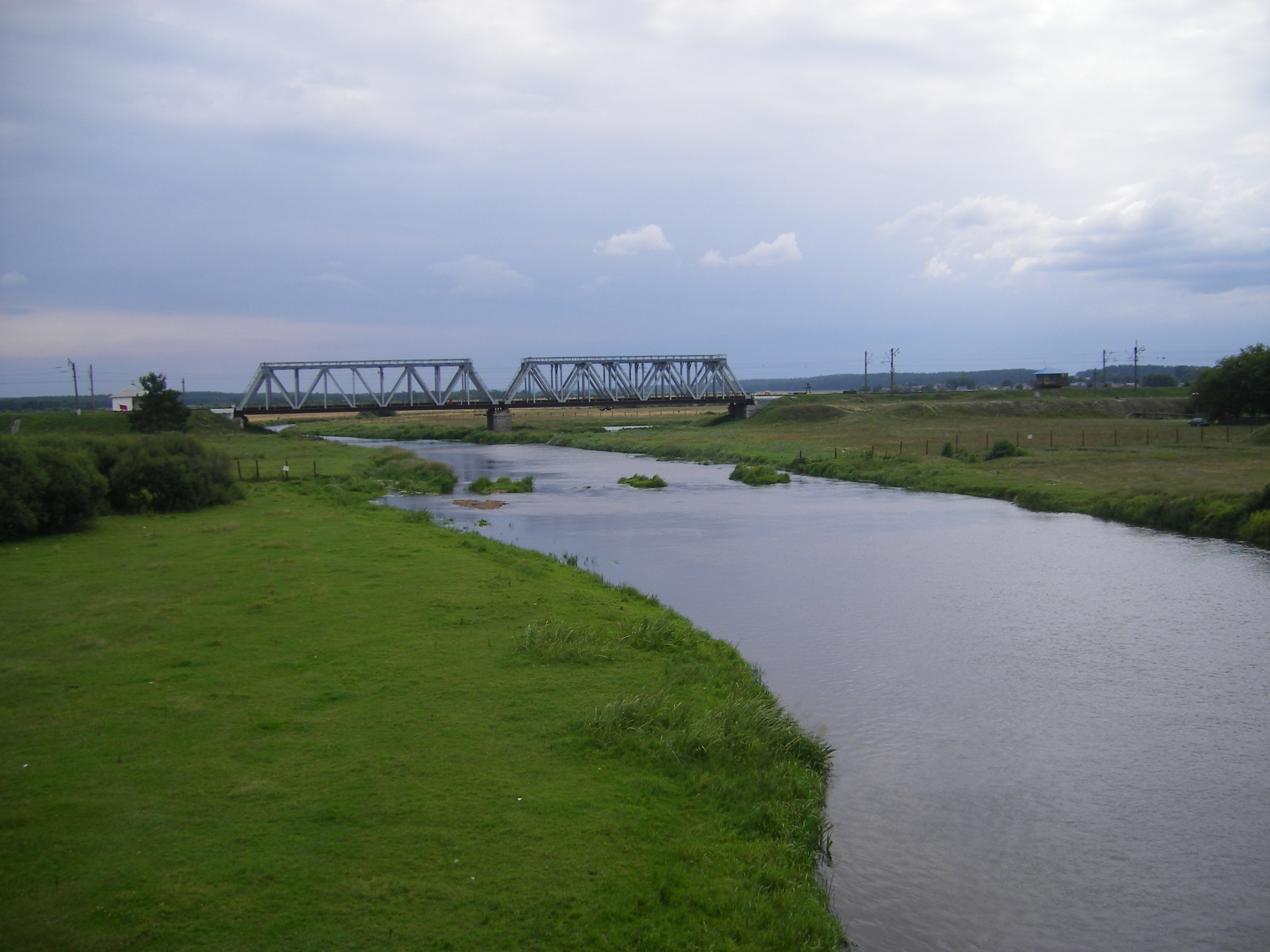
Railway bridge over the Niemen river in Stowbtsy

With the Red Army approaching the pre-war borders of Poland, the leadership of the Polish Underground State began preparations in the spring of 1944 for Operation Tempest. Its aim was to intensify sabotage activities against the retreating German army and subsequently welcome Soviet forces as the legitimate hosts. However, within the Home Army command, there were conflicting concepts regarding the tasks that should be assigned to the Stowbtsy Group when the operation commenced. Initial plans for a general uprising envisioned that the group would block communication routes through the Stowbtsy District, specifically by destroying the bridge over the Niemen river at Stowbtsy and disrupting operations at the railway station there. After the conflict with Soviet partisans erupted, consideration was given to withdrawing Góra's soldiers and other units from the Nowogródek District to central Poland (post-war memoirs of the district commander suggest this). Ultimately, it was decided that the Stowbtsy Group would participate in Operation Tempest within the Inspectorate C of the Nowogródek District (Baranavichy). Its task would particularly include the liberation of the concentration camp in Kołdyczewo.

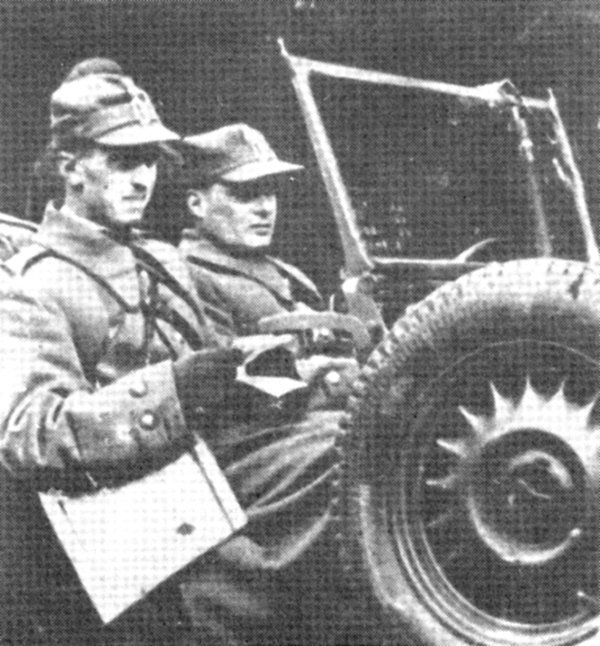
Major Maciej Kalenkiewicz, codenamed Kotwicz, during Operation Ostra Brama

In April 1944, the Home Army command conceived the idea of seizing Vilnius before Soviet re-occupation. Operation Ostra Brama was to involve combined forces from the Vilnius and Nowogródek districts. However, due to the considerable distance between Baranavichy and Vilnius, and the presence of numerous German garrisons and strong Soviet partisan units between the two cities, the Nowogródek District command did not foresee using the units of Inspectorate C in this battle. A different opinion on this matter was held by one of the authors of the operation's plan, Major Maciej Kalenkiewicz, codenamed Kotwicz (commander of the Nadniemen Group). During a briefing held around Lidów on June 17, he informed Lieutenant Kula that he intended to use the units of the Stowbtsy Group in Operation Ostra Brama. When Kula indicated that the group would not be able to break through on its own to the vicinity of Vilnius, Kotwicz promised to facilitate the integration of Góra's soldiers with the main forces of the Vilnius Home Army. The meeting between the Stowbtsy Group and the relief force under Kotwicz was planned to take place around Valozhyn around July 1 or 2 (other sources indicate July 10 as the planned date of concentration). As promised, Kotwicz organized an improvised battalion codenamed Bagatelka, which set off from Dokudowo towards the east on June 22. However, it became entangled in fierce battles with Germans along the way, and as a result, it failed to reach the Naliboki fforest. In clashes at Dyndyliszki and Kwiatkowce, Bagatelka suffered heavy losses, and Kotwicz himself was seriously wounded.

The competency chaos prevailing at that time in the command of the Vilnius and Nowogródek districts can be illustrated by the fact that Inspector of the Baranavichy Inspectorate, Captain Andrzej Wierzbicki, codenamed Józef, who formally oversaw the Stowbtsy Group, was not informed of Kotwicz's plans. According to earlier plans, he expected that Góra's units would conduct sabotage operations in the Baranavichy and Nyasvizh counties.

== Evacuation from the Eastern Borderlands ==
=== Westward march ===
On 22 June 1944, a major Red Army offensive known as Operation Bagration began in Belarus. In a short time, four Soviet fronts almost completely defeated the German Army Group Centre, initiating a rapid westward advance. The Stowbtsy Group, lacking effective communication with the district command, learned about the Red Army's progress through reports from refugees and the sounds of artillery fire. Due to the approaching Soviet forces, the lack of promised maps and guides, and the failure of Major Kotwicz's raid, Lieutenant Góra considered reaching Vilnius, 160 km away, an impossible task. After consulting with subunit commanders, he decided to leave the endangered area and move towards Baranavichy, hoping to contact Inspector Józef for further instructions (June 28/29).

Before starting the retreat, Góra decided to seize Rakaw, where he intended to mobilize members of the local Home Army network. On the morning of June 29, the town was captured by soldiers of 1st Company under Lieutenant Dan. Without encountering resistance, the Polish partisans disarmed 40 Belarusian policemen and three German gendarmes. They also eliminated the Belarusian police post in nearby Borek. Additionally, they disarmed a Belarusian police unit of over thirty men who arrived from Zaslawye. About 50 policemen who were Home Army members or collaborators joined the Polish group, and around 100 members of the youth organization Young Eagles were mobilized. After completing the action, Dan left Rakaw, taking three German gendarmes as hostages. These events were dubbed the "Rakaw Uprising" by the local population.

On the evening of June 29, Dan reached the Rubieżewicze area, where the main forces of the group had stopped. That same day, Góra's units set off towards Baranavichy. Upon learning that the group was leaving the Naliboki forest, the partisans' families and others fearing Soviet reprisals joined the column, adding nearly 150 civilian wagons. In Rubieżewicze, they encountered Soviet partisans, who were driven out and forced to flee. On June 30, Polish soldiers crossed the unguarded bridge over the Niemen in Świerżeń. On the evening of July 1, the 1st and 2nd cavalry squadrons engaged in a fierce battle with a strong unit of Russian-speaking collaborators in the village of Proście near Połoneczka (some sources say that these were subdivisions of the RONA brigade, others refer to the enemy as "Cossacks"). The engagement was resolved only by the intervention of the group's main forces. That evening, two Polish soldiers were killed, and thirteen were wounded, including the 2nd squadron commander, Warrant Officer Józef Niedźwiecki, codenamed Szary.

Upon reaching the Baranavichy area, Góra failed to establish contact with Inspector Józef. Due to a lack of time, the mobilization of Home Army members from the Baranavichy and Nyasvizh areas had to be abandoned, and the planned attack on the Kołdyczewo concentration camp was not carried out (it had already been liquidated by the Germans). Without communication with the command, Góra decided to continue marching westward. On July 3, the Stowbtsy Group reached the village of Derewna near Slonim, where they spent the night and the entire following day. Despite efforts, they failed to contact the local Home Army command. Only a group of about 20 Home Army members led by Cadet Officer Józef Bylewski, codename Grom, joined the group. Shortly before, a messenger from Captain Józef finally reached Góra, but the orders he delivered, which involved conducting sabotage operations in the Baranavichy and Nyasvizh counties, were already outdated. On July 5, the group resumed their westward march, crossing the unguarded bridge over the Shchara river the same day. After crossing the Shchara, wagons with civilian refugees gradually began to detach from the group. On July 6, the Polish units encountered a strong unit of Russian-speaking collaborators in Rościewicze. Both sides parted ways without a single shot. Six days later, Germans detained one of the Polish patrols in the village of Pruszanka Stara. Envoys were sent to the gendarmes, informing them that the Polish group was an anti-Bolshevik formation and threatening force if the detainees were not released. The Germans yielded to this threat, and the partisans were freed.

On the evening of July 15, the Stowbtsy Group crossed the Bug river near Dzierzb in Sokołów County, entering the territory of the General Government. The next day, a solemn field mass was held on the meadows near Dzierzb. After the service, Góra gave a speech to the soldiers, announcing the end of the truce with the Germans. This news caused great enthusiasm among the gathered. Upon hearing of the truce's end, the 2nd squadron cavalrymen independently executed three German gendarmes captured in Rakaw. That same day, the Naliboki soldiers also attacked a German car entering Dzierzb, killing its four occupants.

The march from Dzierzb resumed on July 17. The group moved into Węgrów County, reaching Kałęczyn the next day, where they stayed until July 21. During the march through Podlachia and Mazovia, attempts were made to contact the Home Army command. Local commanders, however, either were unwilling or unable to help, and seeking higher-level contacts for too long was risky due to the rapid advance of the Red Army. Góra and his staff had to independently decide on further steps. Most officers opposed the idea of demobilizing the group and settling soldiers in Podlachia villages. The proposal to move to the Świętokrzyskie Mountains was deemed impractical. Ultimately, they decided to attempt moving to the Kampinos Forest near Warsaw.

On July 24, Góra's soldiers accidentally encountered the Felek 3rd Platoon of Rudy 2nd Company of the Zośka Battalion and a platoon from the Radzymin District, which had to leave their partisan base in the Puszcza Biała due to a German raid. Under the cover of the Naliboki soldiers, both units crossed the Liwiec river and, after crossing the Wyszków–Łochów road, separated from the group. That same day, in the afternoon, Góra's soldiers encountered units of Russian-speaking collaborators but managed to avoid confrontation through negotiations. After spending the night in Marianów and Dręszew, the Polish group distanced themselves from the "Vlasovites" and resumed their march towards Modlin. Through Kowalicha, Ludwinów, Józefów, Serock, Nieporęt, Wieliszew, and Janówek, Góra's soldiers reached Okunin on July 25, where they took a short break.

During the 27-day march, the Stowbtsy Group covered a distance of several hundred kilometers, crossing the Niemen, Shchara, and Bug rivers. Human and equipment losses were minimal. This success was due to Góra's decisiveness and command skills, as well as the chaos that engulfed the German army after their defeat in Belarus. The group moved alongside and less-traveled roads, avoiding contact with larger German units. Smaller enemy units, encountering the numerous and heavily armed group, usually tried to avoid confrontation. When it was necessary to cross a busy main road, the Polish partisans blended into the traffic, slipping between German columns. In contacts with Germans and their allies, they exploited the fact that many of Góra's soldiers still wore Belarusian police uniforms. Until July 16, the three German gendarmes from Rakaw, ostentatiously transported at the front of the column, also served as a form of camouflage. This way, the Polish group successfully passed off as one of the many collaborationist formations retreating westward behind the defeated Wehrmacht.

=== Crossing the Vistula ===
After a short stop in Okunin, the group resumed their march and, slipping between enemy columns, reached the market square in Nowy Dwór Mazowiecki late in the afternoon of July 25. The confused Germans did not open fire, but blocked the nearby bridge over the Vistula as a precaution. Negotiations soon began. The Polish group was represented by a delegation consisting of Lieutenant Kula, Second Lieutenant Dan, Lieutenant Aleksander Wolski, codenamed Jastrząb, and Warrant Officer Stefan Andrzejewski, codenamed Wyżeł. The German side was represented by the commander of the Modlin Fortress Dispersed Units Assembly Point, Colonel H. von Biber, and his adjutant, Major Jaster von Valdan.

The conversation lasted about half an hour. At the outset, Kula informed the Germans that they were dealing with the allied Polish Legion, which was fighting Bolshevism alongside the Wehrmacht. He simultaneously requested permission to cross the bridge and asked for supplies and forage for the unit. In response, Colonel von Biber demanded the Polish delegates present documents verifying their claims. Meanwhile, the Germans prepared for a possible fight. Several armored vehicles approached the bridge area, and the guards took combat positions. Lieutenant Góra, who remained with the main forces of the group, also ordered combat readiness. Ultimately, bloodshed was avoided, as the German officers accepted Kula's explanations and agreed to let the Polish group cross to the western bank of the Vistula. The success of the negotiations was aided by Major von Valdan recognizing in the Greater Poland-born Wyżeł his comrade from the front lines of World War I. On the night of July 25/26, the Polish group, following the instructions received from Colonel von Biber, settled in Dziekanów Polski, surprising and then enthusing the local Polish population.

Upon arrival in Dziekanów Polski, the numbers and organizational structure of the Stowbtsy Group were as follows:

- command (11 people);
- quartermaster's office led by Lieutenant Aleksander Wolski, codenamed Jastrząb (14 people);
- gendarmerie under the command of Corporal Marian Radziwon, codenamed Drzymała (11 people);
- First Battalion of the 78th Słuck Infantry Regiment of the Home Army under the command of Lieutenant Witold Pełczyński, codenamed Dźwig (438 people);
  - First Company (Lieutenant Franciszek Baumgart, codenamed Dan);
  - Second Company (Lieutenant Witold Lenczewski, codenamed Strzała);
  - Third Company (Lieutenant Jerzy Piestrzyński, codenamed Helski);
- First Squadron of the 27th Uhlan Regiment of the Home Army under the command of Warrant Officer Zdzisław Nurkiewicz, codenamed Noc (272 people);
  - First Troop (Sergeant Major Jan Jakubowski, codenamed Dąb);
  - Second Troop (Sergeant Major Józef Niedźwiecki, codenamed Szary);
  - Third Troop (Sergeant Major Candidate Narcyz Kulikowski, codenamed Sum);
  - Fourth Troop (Second Lieutenant Aleksander Pietrucki, codenamed Jawor);
- machine gun squadron under the command of Lieutenant Jarosław Gąsiewski, codenamed Jar, forming the core of the 23rd Grodno Uhlan Regiment of the Home Army (Note: During the group's stay in the Naliboki forest, the name "23rd Grodno Uhlan Regiment of the Home Army" was not used, as the command of the Nowogródek District of the Home Army did not approve it due to the lack of a formal basis (the 23rd Grodno Uhlan Regiment was stationed outside the district's territory before the war). It was only in the Kampinos Forest that Lieutenant Jar managed to persuade Lieutenant Góra to assign this name to the machine gun squadron (Krajewski (2006, p. 108)).) (69 people);
- field hospital led by Doctor Antoni Banis, codenamed Kleszczyk (46 people).

On 26 July 1944, the group comprised 861 officers, non-commissioned officers, and soldiers. The armament included 7 grenade launchers, 11 heavy machine guns, 41 light and heavy machine guns, 43 ten-shot rifles, 53 submachine guns, 627 rifles, 137 pistols, 794 grenades, and 195,500 rounds of ammunition. Additionally, the group had 589 horses, 320 saddles, 185 wagons, and 8 tachankas.

== Participation in the Warsaw Uprising ==
=== First days in the Kampinos Forest ===
Early in the morning of July 26, Góra rode a bicycle to Warsaw, hoping to establish contact with the Home Army leadership. However, the trip to the capital ended in complete failure. Although Góra accidentally met his fellow Silent Unseen Adam Borys, codenamed Pług, on the street, Borys, in response to Góra's request for contact with the command, limited himself to offering to buy weapons from Góra's group. Meanwhile, Captain Józef Krzyczkowski, codenamed Szymon, appeared in Dziekanów. As the commander of the VIII Rejon Łęgi in the Warsaw County Subdistrict, he was responsible for Home Army structures in the eastern part of the Kampinos Forest. (Note: In his memoirs published in the early 1960s, Józef Krzyczkowski noted that Góra's group arrived in Dziekanów Polski on 24 July 1944, which is, however, an obvious mistake (Krzyczkowski (1962, p. 161)).) Szymon was intrigued and concerned by reports of the appearance of strange soldiers in Polish uniforms in his area, and he initially received Lieutenant Kula's explanations with great suspicion, fearing a Gestapo intrigue. Ultimately, however, he promised to communicate with his superiors and convey directives to the Stowbtsy Group regarding further actions.

On July 26 or 27, Szymon established contact with the commander of Warsaw County Subdistrict, Major Kazimierz Krzyżak, codenamed Bronisław. In his initial reaction, Bronisław ordered the disarmament of Góra's group but later proposed buying weapons from his soldiers. Szymon deemed both ideas completely unrealistic. The Warsaw County Subdistrict had only between 350 and 400 armed soldiers, so it was impossible to think of disarming the larger and better-armed Stowbtsy Group. It was also unlikely that the soldiers from the Eastern Borderlands would agree to sell their weapons. Ultimately, Major Bronisław promised to present the entire matter to the highest leadership of the Home Army. Not trusting this promise much, Szymon decided to contact the High Command on his own. He utilized his acquaintance with the head of communications of the High Command, Colonel Kazimierz Pluta-Czachowski, codenamed Kuczaba. The next day, Kuczaba informed Szymon that the High Command had decided to direct the Stowbtsy Group to the Tuchola Forest in Pomerania. He also announced that Góra would face a military court on charges of collaborating with the Germans.

The decision of the Home Army High Command was motivated solely by political reasons. On the eve of the planned uprising, the leadership of the underground army deliberately refrained from using the well-armed and battle-hardened group, fearing that its presence near Warsaw would hinder cooperation with the Red Army. Furthermore, the order, which Stanisław Podlewski later described as crazy and insane, effectively doomed the Stowbtsy Group to destruction, as the soldiers from the Eastern Borderlands had no chance of breaking through several hundred kilometers into the German rear. It has not yet been established who personally was behind the issuance of this order (it was given only verbally). According to Kazimierz Krajewski, the author or authors of this order should be sought among the officers of the Home Army High Command who supported a compromise with the Soviet Union.

Shaken by the content of the order, Góra told Szymon that he could not carry it out. Instead, he proposed that he and his entire group submit to his command. Szymon quickly seized upon this proposal. He shared Góra's opinion about the senselessness of the march to the Tuchola Forest and also realized that incorporating the Stowbtsy Group would increase the strength of his district by nearly 900 well-armed and experienced partisans. This would change the balance of power in the eastern part of the Kampinos Forest, giving his district a chance to carry out the tasks assigned by the uprising plans. Szymon again contacted Colonel Kuczaba, asking him to convey to the High Command the request to incorporate Góra's units into the VIII Region. Eventually, the Home Army leadership agreed, stipulating, however, that Szymon would take command of the Stowbtsy Group at his own risk.

After taking command of Góra's group, Captain Szymon decided that, depending on the further actions of the Germans, the Naliboki soldiers would either immediately engage in combat or remain on standby. It was also decided to send a group of Eastern Borderlands cavalrymen to Modlin, to obtain as much ammunition, medicine, and medical supplies from the fortress garrison as possible, exploiting the enemy's belief that they were dealing with a collaborationist unit. This ruse was partially successful. The Germans indeed provided Góra's soldiers with a significant amount of supplies, but as the Polish unit was leaving Modlin, the deception was discovered. A fight ensued, in which one Polish uhlan was killed. On July 29, Szymon ordered the Naliboki group to leave Dziekanów and move to the area of the villages of Wiersze and Truskawka in the central part of the Kampinos Forest. On the way, Góra's soldiers eliminated German gendarmerie and border guard posts in Kaliszki. On July 31, the Naliboki units completely defeated a Wehrmacht company stationed in the village of Aleksandrów. For the price of only two wounded, nearly 50 Germans were killed, and a significant amount of weapons and ammunition was captured. Five prisoners were also taken, who were released after being disarmed and stripped of their uniforms. The clash in Aleksandrów dispelled Szymon's last doubts about the true intentions of Góra and his soldiers. It is also considered the actual beginning of the uprising in the Kampinos Forest.

In the last days of July, Lieutenant Kula separated from the group. Due to contracting dysentery, he went to Warsaw for treatment, where he was caught by the outbreak of the uprising.

=== Fighting from 1 August 1944 to 15 August 1944 ===
On August 1 at 3:00 PM, Captain Szymon received the order from the commander of the Warsaw District of the Home Army to start the uprising in the capital and its outskirts. Given that this happened just two hours before the designated start time, the scattered and not fully mobilized forces of the VIII Region had no chance to complete their concentration and strike their main target, which was the Bielany airfield, by the deadline. Ultimately, only the partially mobilized 1st Battalion of the Kampinos forces took part in the first attack on the airfield. The main forces of the VIII Region completed their concentration in the area of Hill 103 in Łuże in the night of August 1/2.

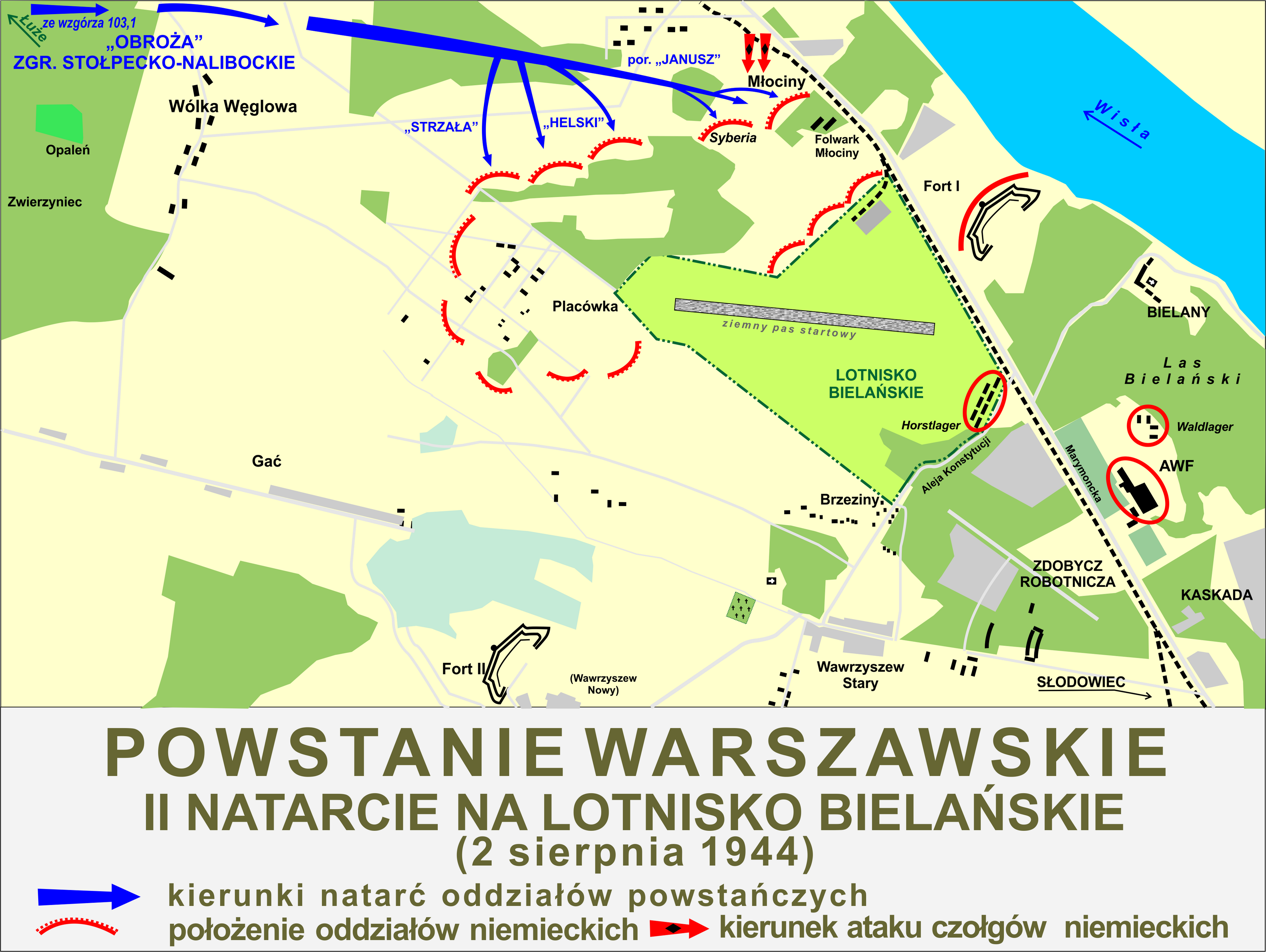
Second attack on the Bielany airfield

The second attack began around 4:00 AM on August 2. At that time, 984 Home Army soldiers attacked, including infantry from Lieutenant Dźwig's battalion and Lieutenant Jar's heavy machine gun squadron (the Naliboki units formed the right wing of the attack). However, the VIII Region forces were too poorly armed and too few to capture the heavily fortified airfield. After hours of fighting, all Polish attacks were repelled. Lieutenant Góra, who took command of all forces in place of the severely wounded Szymon, had to order a retreat to the Łuże area due to a lack of ammunition and the threat of a flank attack from the Modlin road. The VIII Region suffered 31 killed and 45 wounded in this battle, with the Naliboki units losing 9 killed or missing and several wounded. A particularly painful loss was the death of the popular commander of the Third Company, Lieutenant Helski. The Home Army units in the Kampinos Forest remained incapable of conducting significant offensive actions until mid-August 1944. Nevertheless, the German command soon ordered the destruction of the Bielany airfield. Some Polish historians and veterans were convinced that it was the VIII Region's attacks that prompted the Germans to abandon the base.

While the main forces of the VIII Region were storming the airfield, the dismounted squadron of the 27th Uhlan Regiment attempted to block the Warsaw–Modlin road. In ambushes near Pieńków and Buraków, the Naliboki uhlans killed between 34 and 41 Germans and destroyed 17 vehicles. Their own losses were limited to one killed and two wounded. However, lacking anti-tank weapons, the uhlans had to withdraw when German tanks appeared on the road.

After the unsuccessful attack on the airfield, the VIII Region forces withdrew deeper into the Kampinos Forest, to the area of the villages of Wiersze, Truskawka, Janówek, and Krogulec. On August 3, a German company was surprised and destroyed near Truskawka. For the price of relatively small losses, the Polish soldiers killed nearly 70 Germans and captured several more. The Naliboki soldiers (infantry from the 1st and 3rd Companies and uhlans from the 3rd Squadron) played a decisive role in this clash. Additionally, on the same day, the uhlans from the 2nd Squadron fought a victorious skirmish with a small Wehrmacht unit conducting requisitions in the Kampinos villages. These victories significantly boosted the morale of the Kampinos Home Army units, which had been shaken by the earlier defeat at the Bielany airfield.

On August 3, the Palmiry-Młociny Regiment of the Home Army was formed from the Kampinos units of the VIII Region and the units of the Stowbtsy Group. The severely wounded Szymon handed over command of the regiment during combat operations to Lieutenant Pilch. Szymon reserved assigning combat tasks and overall leadership for himself. At Szymon's request, most of the officers of the Stowbtsy Group changed their pseudonyms. Thus, Lieutenant Góra was henceforth known as Dolina, Lieutenant Dźwig as Witold, Warrant Officer Noc as Nieczaj, Sergeant Dąb as Wołodyjowski, and Sergeant Szary as Lawina.

In the evening of August 7, the units of the Palmiry-Młociny Regiment attacked German outposts along the road connecting Leszno and Babice. Witold's battalion, supported by Nieczaj's lancers, partially drove the Germans out of Borzęcin Duży, Zaborów, and Zaborówek. Meanwhile, the poorly armed Kampinos battalion, attacking the section between Zielonki and Zalesie, retreated from the fight on the orders of its commander, Captain Stanisław Nowosad, codenamed Dulka, when a German reconnaissance plane appeared in the sky. That same night, Dulka, without consulting the command, ordered the dissolution of his battalion. The strength of the Palmiry-Młociny Regiment thus dwindled from 2,000 soldiers to about 1,400. According to Kazimierz Krajewski, only the presence of the soldiers of the Stowbtsy Group allowed the insurgent action in the Kampinos Forest to continue at that time.

In the following days, the Naliboki units continued to fight with the Germans. On August 8, enemy tanks attacked the positions of the 1st and 2nd Squadrons in the Buda and Truskawka area. Two days later, Lieutenant Dan's infantry company drove the Germans out of Brzozówka (at the cost of three killed, they killed about eighteen Germans). An attack by Lieutenant Strzała's company on Leoncin (the night of August 11/12) ended in failure.

=== Naliboki soldiers in Warsaw ===
The Home Army command hoped that a strong partisan group from the Kampinos Forest would be able to come to the aid of insurgent Warsaw. The first orders in this matter reached Captain Szymon as early as August 8. However, due to the lack of weapons and ammunition and organizational difficulties, Szymon delayed sending his units to Warsaw.

By order of August 8, Szymon confirmed the transfer of combat command of the forces of the VIII Region to Dolina, simultaneously entrusting him with the task of integrating all Home Army units in the forest into one group. However, this task proved impossible due to jurisdictional and ambition disputes among the Home Army officers present in the forest. Captain Władysław Nowakowski, codenamed Serb, who arrived in the forest in early August with nearly 160 soldiers from the III Region of the Żoliborz Subdistrict, refused to subordinate to the VIII Region command. On August 11, Inspector of the Skierniewice Home Army Inspectorate, Lieutenant Colonel Ludwik Konarski, codenamed Wiktor or Victor, arrived at the headquarters of the Palmiry-Młociny Regiment in Wiersze, who, on behalf of the commander of the Western Subdistrict Hajduki, Lieutenant Colonel Franciszek Jachieć, codenamed Roman, attempted to subordinate all Kampinos units to himself. Victor and Roman referred primarily to pre-uprising guidelines from the Home Army Headquarters, which stipulated that all partisan units arriving from other areas were to subordinate themselves to the local commander (Wiersze was on the Hajduki territory). However, Szymon and Dolina, pointing to orders received from the Home Army Headquarters a few days earlier, firmly refused to comply with Victor's orders. Although the Home Army command had already appointed Major Alfons Kotowski, codenamed Okoń, as commander of the Kampinos units on August 9, he did not reach Wiersze until a week later. Subsequent events showed that Okoń lacked the appropriate leadership qualities, and his vulgarity and violent character negatively affected the soldiers' morale. According to Kazimierz Krajewski, the command talents and combat experience made Lieutenant Dolina the best candidate to command the newly formed Kampinos Group. However, this was impossible due to his low rank and the Home Army Headquarters' lack of trust in him.

The insurgent command sent increasingly alarming orders to the Kampinos Group. Under these circumstances, on the evening of August 15, a well-armed relief force set out for Warsaw. Its core was a battalion of over 450 soldiers from the Palmiry-Młociny Regiment, led by the former commander of the Naliboki infantry, Lieutenant Witold. Most of the battalion's soldiers also came from the Stowbtsy Group, though, given the prospect of urban fighting, some companies were partly assigned Warsaw command staff and supplemented with soldiers from the city or its suburbs. (Note: Among the three company commanders, only Lieutenant Franciszek Baumgart, codenamed Dan, came from the Stowbtsy-Naliboki Group. The other two were led by Warsaw officers – Lieutenant Henryk Czerwiec, codenamed Jaskólski, and Second Lieutenant Józef Krzywicki, codenamed Prawdzic (Bonarowski (2014, pp. 61–62, 68)).) The relief force, which included Captain Serb's Żoliborz group and the so-called Sochaczew Company from the Hajduki Subdistrict, set out for the city under the overall command of Lieutenant Colonel Victor. That night, however, the expected attack on the rear of the German Reinefarth Battle Group did not occur. After many adventures, the Polish column, without engaging the Germans, moved to insurgent Żoliborz. In the darkness of the night, nearly 300 soldiers lost their way and returned to the forest. This included more than half of Witold's battalion, namely the entire 150-strong company of Second Lieutenant Prawdzic and two platoons from Lieutenant Jaskólski's company (100 soldiers). These units reached Żoliborz only on the night of August 19/20, along with the second wave of relief organized by Major Okoń.

On August 20, there were already six companies from the Kampinos Group in Żoliborz, numbering from 750 to 940 well-armed soldiers. The insurgent command decided to use the forest soldiers to break through the German barrier separating the Old Town from Żoliborz, centered around the Warszawa Gdańska railway station and the nearby circumferential railway line. This task was extremely difficult, as the station and tracks were defended by numerous German defensive positions, reinforced by bunkers and protected by barbed wire entanglements. The defenders were additionally supported by an armored train, and the tracks' foreground was flanked from the west and east by German artillery and machine gun fire from the nearby Chemical Institute, Buraków, Citadel, Traugutt Fort and Romuald Traugutt Park. The Polish units, on the other hand, did not have heavy weapons, and their command had a very vague idea of the enemy's numbers and positions. The forest soldiers were unfamiliar with the future battlefield and had no experience in urban warfare. The commander of insurgent Żoliborz, Lieutenant Colonel Mieczysław Niedzielski, codenamed Żywiciel, did not agree to assign them local guides. Abolishing the previous organizational division into Witold's Naliboki and Mścisław's Kampinos-Sochaczew battalions also proved to be a fatal move. Instead of integrated battalions, waves of mixed composition and limited practical control by their formal commanders went on the offensive.

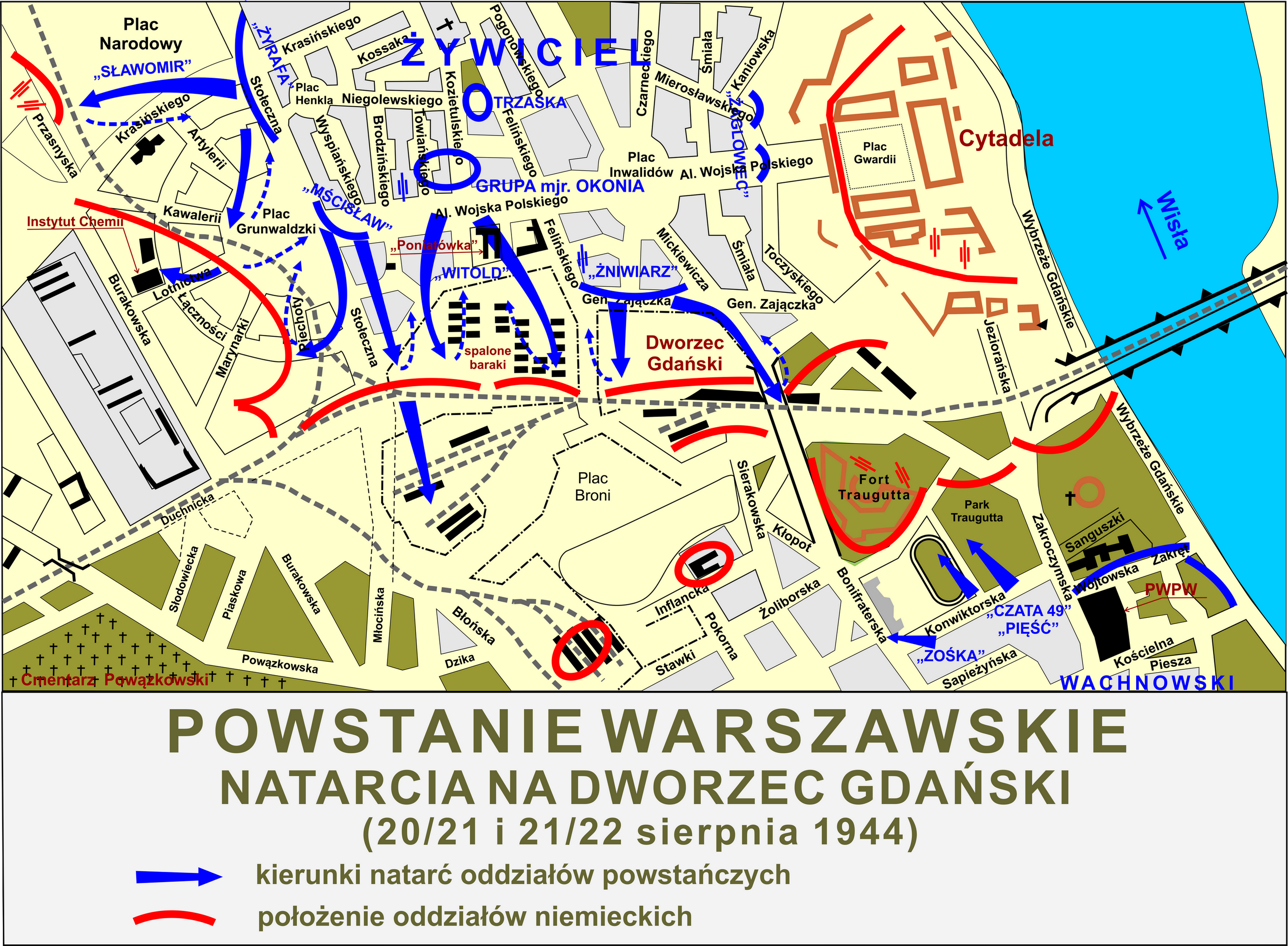
Insurgent attacks on the Warszawa Gdańska railway station

The first attack on the Warszawa Gdańska railway station occurred on the night of August 20/21. The first wave broke under enemy fire, but the following companies of Jaskólski and Prawdzic managed to eliminate forward enemy positions and reach the foreground of the circumferential railway tracks. However, Lieutenant Colonel Żywiciel did not send the remaining companies into the attack, and the Naliboki soldiers soon received orders to return to their starting positions (according to Edward Bonarowski, the only real chance to break through the German barrier was squandered that night). The insurgent command decided to repeat the attack the next night, this time with greater participation from the Old Town and Żoliborz units. General Tadeusz Pełczyński, codenamed Grzegorz, Chief of Staff of the Home Army Headquarters, was to personally oversee the attack. However, several mistakes from the first attack were repeated, such as neglecting to properly reconnoiter enemy positions, not assigning local guides to the forest soldiers, and overburdening soldiers with additional weapon and ammunition allocations. Moreover, after the previous night's experiences, the German soldiers remained vigilant, staying on alert. As a result, shortly after the attack began, the Polish units came under heavy enemy artillery and machine gun fire. The decisive factor in the battle was the appearance of the German armored train on the tracks. Although part of the Naliboki company of Lieutenant Dan managed to break through to the other side of the tracks, most of the soldiers there were killed or captured. (Note: That night, the forest soldiers and the Żoliborz insurgents saw Lieutenant Dan for the last time. Most sources indicate that he fell along with most of his soldiers while attempting to cross the orbital railway tracks. It was only in the early second decade of the 21st century that Marian Podgóreczny managed to establish that Lieutenant Franciszek Baumgart, codenamed Dan, a participant in the famous escape from the Oflag VI-B, not only survived the night battle but also broke through to the insurgent-controlled area with a group of his soldiers. He then fought under the pseudonym Pomorzak in the Old Town and Śródmieście. Dan survived the uprising and the war, and he died in 1979 in Sztum (Bonarowski (2014, pp. 116–117, 308–312)).) The remaining companies, suffering heavy losses, retreated to their starting positions. Historians estimate that the Kampinos and Żoliborz units lost between 450 and 600 soldiers in the two attacks on the Warszawa Gdańska railway station. Among the dead were probably about 170 soldiers of the Stowbtsy-Naliboki Group, with only 32 names of the fallen identified.

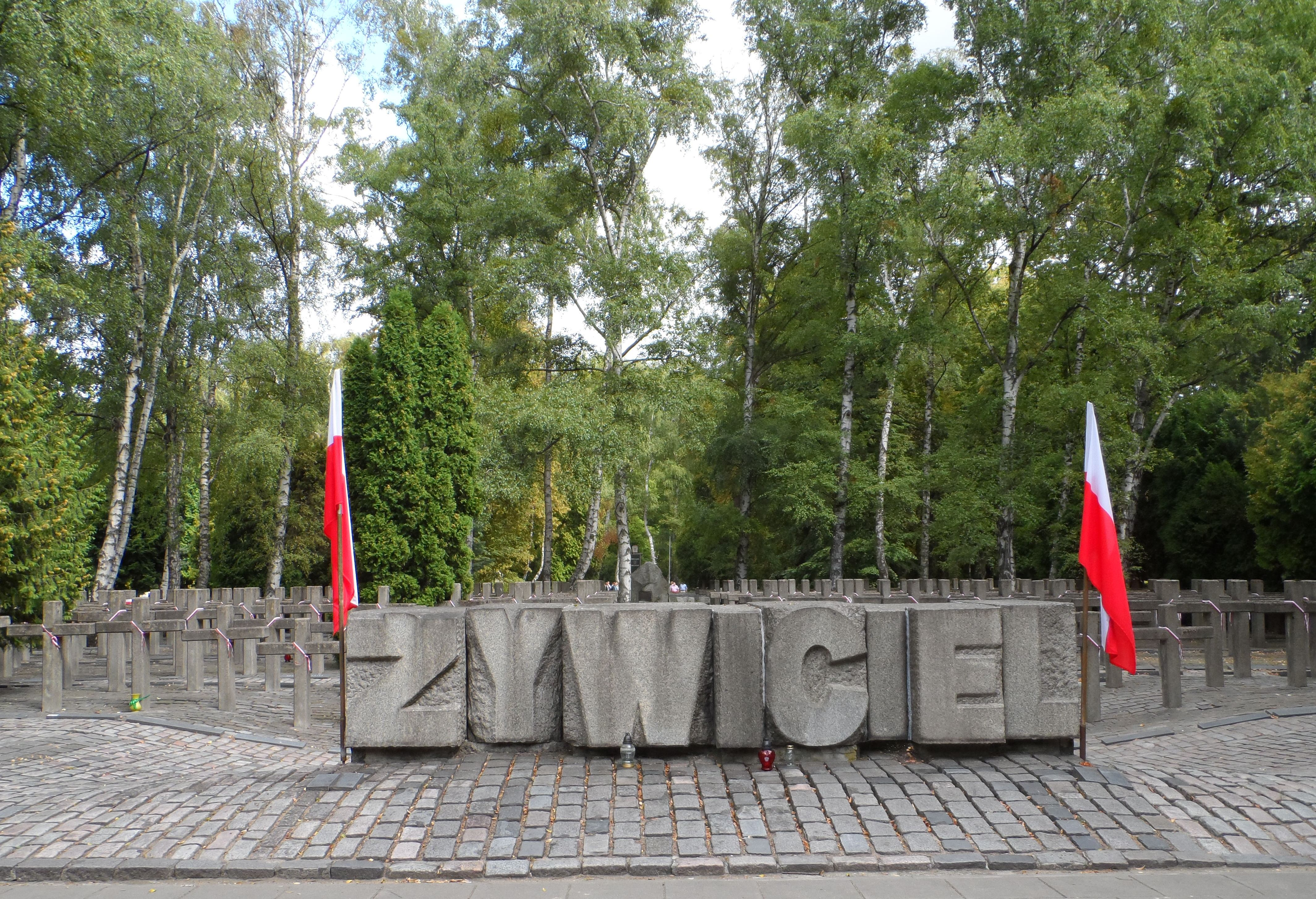
Żywiciel's quarters at the Powązki Military Cemetery. Beside the soldiers of the Żoliborz Subdistrict, soldiers of the Stowbtsy Group who fell during the attacks on the Warszawa Gdańska railway station and the defense of Żoliborz are buried there

After the defeat at the Warszawa Gdańska railway station, General Grzegorz ordered Major Okoń to return with the remnants of the battalion to the Kampinos Forest. (Note: Before heading to the forest, the forest soldiers were ordered to surrender all their weapons and ammunition. The soldiers of the forest detachments, exhausted from two days of fighting and disheartened by the defeat and the loss of many comrades, received this order with great bitterness. The brutal enforcement of this order by Okoń caused particular outrage in the ranks. Witnesses claimed that the major, known for his hot temper and vulgarity, snatched weapons from some soldiers' hands, not sparing curses and insults. From the beginning, the forest soldiers treated Okoń with distrust and unjustly held him mainly responsible for the defeat at the Warszawa Gdańska railway station. After the disarmament of the survivors, the major aroused outright hatred among many subordinates (Bonarowski (2014, p. 123); Krzyczkowski (1962, p. 310); Pilch (2013, p. 221)).) However, Lieutenant Witold decided to stay in Żoliborz, and over 150 forest soldiers, mostly his former subordinates from the Stowbtsy Group, made the same decision. Three platoons were organized from the remnants of the Naliboki companies. Platoons 207 and 209 were commanded by Lieutenant Jaskólski and Second Lieutenant Prawdzic, respectively, as they were formed from their former companies. The command of Platoon 208, organized from the remnants of Lieutenant Dan's company, was taken by Lieutenant Edward Bonarowski, codenamed Ostromir. Initially, the forest platoons were part of the Żaba Group, commanded by Lieutenant Witold. The new group's task was to defend the southern section of Żoliborz, including one of the main bastions of the insurgent defense, the Józef Poniatowski High School. However, on August 26, the Żoliborz insurgent command decided to disband Żaba Group. Platoons 207 and 208 were incorporated into the Żaglowiec Group and remained at their current positions, while Platoon 209 was sent to Promyka Street in Lower Żoliborz, where it joined the Żbik Group. Lieutenant Witold was assigned to the staff of Lieutenant Colonel Żywiciel. The forest platoons fought in the defense of Żoliborz until the district's capitulation on September 30.

=== In the "Independent Republic of Kampinos" ===
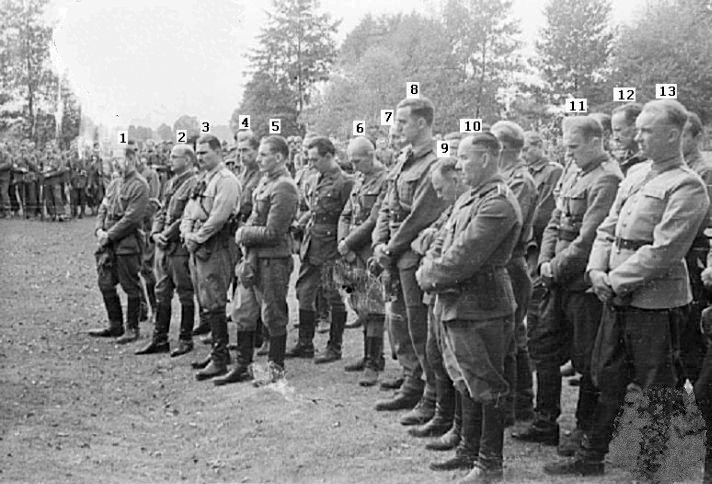
The officer corps of Kampinos Group during a field mass in Wiersze. Among those visible in the photograph are Major Okoń (number 1) and Lieutenant Dolina (number 3)

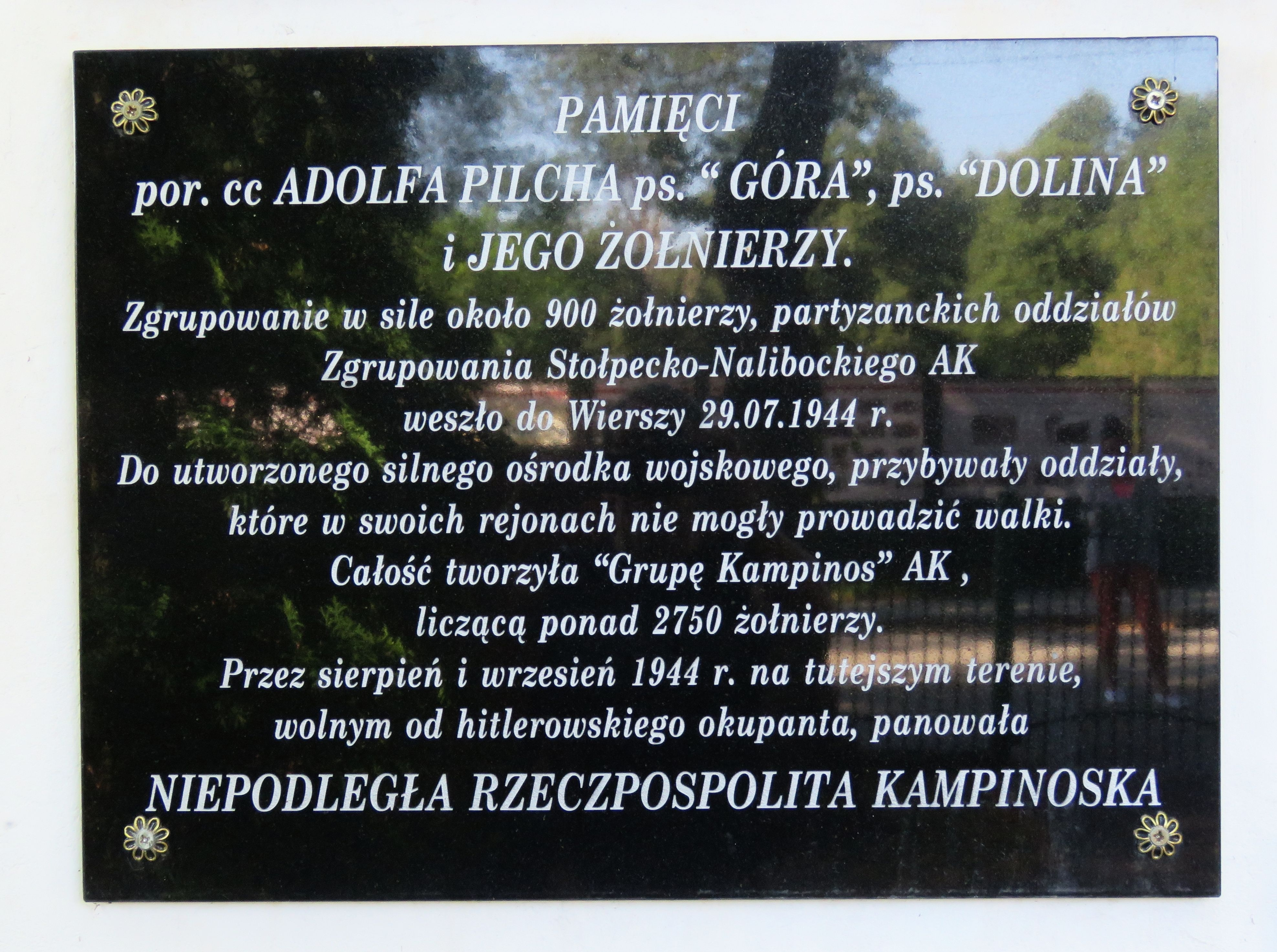
Plaque on the wall of the church in Wiersze commemorates the participation of Lieutenant Dolina and his soldiers in the battles in the Kampinos Forest

By the end of August 1944, Kampinos Group had liberated the eastern and central areas of the Kampinos Forest from German occupation (areas inhabited by several thousand people). Under the control of the partisans were the villages of Ławy, Łubiec, Roztoka, Kiścinne, Krogulec, Wędziszew, Brzozówka, Truskawka, Janówek, Pociecha, Zaborów Leśny, and Wiersze. The area liberated by the Home Army soldiers was called the "Independent Republic of Kampinos". Its informal capital was Wiersze, where the headquarters of the group was located.

After over a thousand soldiers moved to Żoliborz, only about 500 armed partisans remained in the forest. The only larger operational unit with real combat value was the squadron of Uhlans under Captain Nieczaj. In the second half of August, the Naliboki cavalrymen intensively patrolled the borders of the "Independent Republic of Kampinos", conducting numerous raids and ambushes. Their activity kept the Germans under the mistaken impression that there was a large partisan group in the Kampinos Forest. As a result, the enemy did not attempt to destroy Kampinos Group during its greatest weakness, limiting themselves to cautious offensive actions in the Brzozówka and Janówek areas (August 22). Kazimierz Krajewski believed that in this way, the soldiers of the Stowbtsy-Naliboki Group saved the insurgent action in the Kampinos Forest for the second time.

On August 24, Major Okoń returned to Wiersze. He brought with him an order signed by General Pełczyński, confirming that all Home Army units in the Kampinos Forest were now under his command. According to this order, the primary task of the forest units was to receive drops from Allied aviation and organize regular deliveries of weapons, ammunition, food, and equipment for the fighting capital. In the following weeks, Okoń strictly adhered to these conservative guidelines, not deciding to undertake more serious sabotage actions behind the German lines fighting in Warsaw. Only thanks to the initiative of Dolina and other younger officers were several offensive actions organized between September 3 and 27, usually of local importance. Particularly successful were the raids on the subunits of the collaborative Kaminski Brigade quartered in Truskaw and Marianów (the first raid led by Dolina, the second by Nieczaj). Hundreds of Russians were killed, and large quantities of weapons, ammunition, and military equipment were captured. As a result of these defeats, the notorious Kaminski Brigade, known for numerous war crimes, had to be withdrawn from the vicinity of Warsaw. A significant success was also the attack on the sawmill in Piaski Królewskie led by Dolina. Additionally, Nieczaj's uhlans conducted several smaller raids and ambushes and took an active part in the defensive battles at Pociecha and Kiścinne (in the latter battle, they completely destroyed a German company).

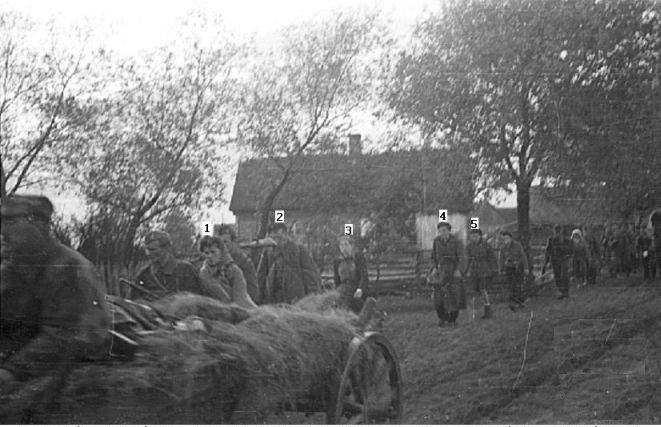
Retreat of Home Army units from the Kampinos Forest

On September 27, the Germans launched a large-scale anti-partisan operation in the Kampinos Forest, codenamed Sternschnuppe (English: Falling Star). Following Major Okoń's earlier plans, Kampinos Group began to retreat towards the Świętokrzyskie Mountains. Despite the poor organization of the march, the Polish group initially evaded the encirclement effectively. During the retreat, Dolina and his soldiers covered the rear of Kampinos Group, fighting the German pursuit in the Łuszczewko and Baranów areas. At dawn on September 29, the Polish group reached the railway tracks of the Warsaw–Żyrardów line near the village of Budy Zosine, near Jaktorów. Okoń unexpectedly ordered a several-hour stop. The major probably intended to allow stragglers and the rear guard to join the main forces and use the break in the march to rest and reorganize the column. This, however, gave the Germans time to gather numerous units in the area and encircle the Polish group. After an all-day battle with superior enemy forces, Kampinos Group was defeated, losing between 150 and 200 killed, about 120 wounded, about 150 taken prisoner, and almost all its heavy weapons and transport. Among the killed were about 75 soldiers of the Stowbtsy Group, including the commander of the 3rd Squadron, Cadet Officer Narcyz, and the quartermaster, Lieutenant Jastrząb, while Captain Nieczaj and Lieutenant Strzała were wounded. The commanders of the 1st and 2nd Uhlan Squadrons, Senior Warrant Officer Wołodyjowski and Senior Warrant Officer Lawina, were captured by the Germans.

However, many Home Army soldiers, including several intact units, managed to escape from the encirclement near Jaktorów. Lieutenant Dolina, with an improvised unit of over 50 men, broke through two German skirmish lines and then reached the nearby Mariańska Forest. At least 140 uhlans from the 1st, 2nd, and 4th Squadrons also broke through the encirclement in a fierce cavalry charge. Additionally, about 50 soldiers from the 3rd Squadron, which covered the charge, managed to escape from the encirclement. Some survivors reached the Mariańska Forest and joined Dolina's unit. Others returned to the Kampinos Forest, found shelter among the local population, or independently made their way to the Kielce region.

Summarizing the participation of the Stowbtsy-Naliboki Group in the Warsaw Uprising, historians point out that in terms of numbers and quality, its soldiers formed the core of the insurgent forces in the Kampinos Forest, both in the first days of August 1944 and after the formation of Kampinos Group. Without their participation, the uprising in the Kampinos Forest would likely have ended within a few days, as it did in other areas of the Warsaw County Subdistrict. Dolina's soldiers participated in 40 of the nearly 50 battles and skirmishes of Kampinos Group, with about 30 clashes fought entirely independently. The number of soldiers of the Stowbtsy-Naliboki Group who died in Warsaw and the Kampinos Forest is estimated at over 350.

== Battles in the Piotrków and Kielce regions ==
After the defeat at Jaktorów, about 200 soldiers from Kampinos Group managed to reach the Mariańska Forest, including around 70 infantrymen. Command over the remnants was taken by Lieutenant Dolina. Contrary to earlier plans, the lieutenant decided to stay in the forest for a while to gather as many soldiers as possible who were making their way towards the Świętokrzyskie Mountains on their own. Thanks to this decision, several dozen more survivors from Jaktorów were able to join the unit. Increased German activity soon forced Dolina to retreat across the Pilica river. The crossing was made on the night of October 2/3 near Nowe Miasto (between Lubocz and Dąbrowa). For nearly a day, the unit hid in the vicinity of Nowe Miasto, awaiting the expected arrival of Lieutenant Lawa's air company. (Note: With the permission of Major Okoń, it separated from the main forces of Kampinos Group shortly before the Battle of Jaktorów (Krzyczkowski (1962, pp. 468)).) When Lawa did not appear as scheduled, Dolina's unit moved to the Przysucha forests.

During the stop in the Przysucha forests, Dolina partially disbanded his unit, leaving the wounded and sick under the care of the local population. He himself, along with 80 cavalrymen, returned around October 10 across the Pilica river to gather more precise information about the scale of the defeat of Kampinos Group. On October 14, Dolina's partisans set an ambush on the road near Wola Pękoszewska. They destroyed several cars and captured some ammunition and other supplies. The next day, during a stop in the village of Pniowe, they attacked a German subunit that unexpectedly approached the Polish positions. For the price of one fallen soldier, they destroyed two vehicles, killed about 30 Germans, and took twelve more prisoners, including the commanding captain. On the evening of October 16, the Polish unit reached the tracks of the Skierniewice–Żyrardów railway line, which turned out to be heavily guarded by the Germans. Faced with the enemy's heavy presence, Dolina abandoned both the idea of breaking through to the Kampinos Forest area and further staying near Skierniewice. Despite pursuit by German armored units, the Polish unit managed to withdraw across the Pilica river again on the night of October 17/18.

=== In the ranks of the 25th Home Army Infantry Regiment ===
On October 24, Dolina's unit reached Niemojewskie Hills, where it joined the 25th Home Army Infantry Regiment of the Piotrków-Opoczno Land, commanded by Major Rudolf Majewski, codenamed Leśniak (earlier, smaller groups of soldiers from the Kampinos Group had already reached the regiment). After midnight on October 27, Dolina's unit engaged in a skirmish with a unit of Ukrainian collaborators in the village of Biały Ług. This escalated into an all-day battle involving the main forces of the regiment on the Polish side and between several hundred to as many as 3,000 Germans and Ukrainians on the German side. The battle's tide turned when Dolina's unit performed a deep flanking maneuver and struck the enemy from behind with a sudden attack. In the clash at Biały Ług, the 25th Infantry Regiment soldiers killed up to 140 enemies and captured a significant amount of weapons. Their own losses were limited to 9 killed and 20 wounded. Dolina was slightly wounded, and his unit lost one killed and two wounded.

After midnight on October 28, Dolina's unit, along with the rest of the 25th Infantry Regiment, stopped in Bulianów. At dawn, the cavalry intercepted four horse-drawn carts passing on a nearby road, capturing two Germans and ten soldiers from the Ostlegionen. While stationed in Bulianów, Dolina ordered the re-mobilization of the Kampinos-Naliboki infantry, which had been temporarily demobilized after crossing the Pilica river. On October 30, Major Leśniak instructed the formation of a separate subunit from the remnants of the Kampinos Group. This unit was named the III Battalion of the 25th Home Army Infantry Regiment but was commonly known as the "Kampinos Battalion". The battalion, commanded by Lieutenant Dolina, included the 7th Infantry Company of the 78th Slutsk Rifle Regiment led by Senior Sergeant Walerian Żuchowicz, codenamed Opończa, and a cavalry squadron under the command of Second Lieutenant Zygmunt Koc, codenamed Dąbrowa (comprising about 120 infantrymen and lancers).

At that time, the 25th Home Army Infantry Regiment numbered about 1,200 soldiers and was the only such large partisan unit of the Home Army in the Kielce region. Due to the fact that the regiment operated directly behind the front lines and in an area lacking larger forest complexes, it was impossible to avoid heavy fighting with the Germans in the long run. On November 4, Major Leśniak's units became entangled in an all-day battle in the Huta forester's lodge area near Zapniów. About 20 Polish soldiers were killed in the fight, and another 30 were wounded. Among the fallen was the deputy commander of the regiment, Major Bronisław Lewkowicz, codenamed Kurs (previously the commander of the drop platoon in the Kampinos Group). The Germans, having lost about 100 killed, withdrew from the battlefield, but by bringing in significant forces, they managed to block almost all roads and paths leading to the Przysucha forests. On the night of November 4/5, the regiment managed to slip out of the encirclement and, after an all-night march, reached Boków. The stop in the village lasted only a few hours, as the German pursuit soon arrived there. After a five-hour fight, the Germans managed to push the Home Army soldiers into the nearby forest, but the 25th Infantry Regiment once again evaded the sweep. The Polish unit lost about 40 killed and 50 wounded in this clash (ten of the wounded were burned alive by the Germans in a makeshift hospital). Enemy losses were estimated at 50 killed. As a result of the two-day fighting, the number of Polish soldiers was reduced to about 560, more than half. Fatigue and lack of ammunition were taking their toll.

After the battle at Boków, the unit withdrew to the forests near Radoszyce, where they set up an all-day rest. On November 7, Polish scouts reported that the Germans were bringing significant forces into the area. Dolina and other officers then proposed to the regiment's commander an immediate move to the forests south of the Końskie–Kielce road. Leśniak, wanting to allow the soldiers a longer rest, agreed only to a move to the area of the villages of Niebo and Piekło near Końskie. They set up a rest stop there for several hours, then on the afternoon of November 8, the 25th Infantry Regiment set off westward. Leśniak intended to return to the Opoczno forests, but while crossing the road near Wincentów, the unit came under heavy enemy fire. Panic broke out in the column, and only a counterattack by the Kampinos Battalion, which engaged the German machine gun nests, allowed the regiment to continue its retreat. In the ensuing chaos, some units became scattered, and during the crossing of the road and subsequent passage through the swamps, almost 50% of the transport and a significant amount of weapons were lost. In the early morning hours of November 9, the unit, reduced to just under 300 soldiers, reached Niemojewskie Hills. During the evening briefing, Major Leśniak decided to disband the 25th Infantry Regiment. He also commended the Kampinos Battalion for their exemplary conduct in the recent battles.

=== Last battles of Dolina's squadron ===
After the disbandment of the 25th Infantry Regiment, Dolina partially dissolved his battalion. All infantrymen, as well as sick and wounded lancers, were demobilized. The unit, henceforth known as the Independent Dolina Uhlan Squadron, was reduced to 60 cavalrymen (all armed with machine guns). Organizationally, the unit remained divided into two platoons, commanded by Second Lieutenant Dąbrowa and Sergeant Antoni Burdziełowski, codenamed Wir.

The squadron's operational area was heavily saturated with enemy units, forcing Dolina's soldiers to stay constantly on the move. They tried to avoid unnecessary clashes with the Germans, primarily to prevent retaliatory reprisals against the civilian population. On November 26, Dolina's unit were surrounded by Germans in the forests around Niemojewskie Hills. That same night, they broke through the encirclement with a sudden cavalry charge, suffering only a few horse casualties. In early December, the partisans conducted a requisition in the village of Brzeziny, predominantly inhabited by Volksdeutsche. During this operation, the local Sonderdienst commander was shot, and one Polish lancer was killed in the ensuing firefight. On 3 January 1945, Lieutenant Franciszek Rybka, codenamed Kula, Dolina's former deputy and the last commander of the Stowbtsy Center, rejoined the unit.

On 12 January 1945, the Red Army launched a large-scale offensive known as the Vistula–Oder offensive. The German defenses along the Vistula line were quickly broken. On January 17, while stationed near Modrzew, Dolina's unit disarmed nearly 70 retreating Germans and soldiers of the Ostlegionen. That evening, Dolina ordered the disbandment of the unit and granted leave to all soldiers.

Kazimierz Krajewski reports that Dolina's unit fought at least 20 battles and skirmishes in the Piotrków and Kielce regions, including 14 during their service with the 25th Infantry Regiment. Meanwhile, Marian Podgóreczny estimated that between 4 October 1944 and 17 January 1945, Dolina and his soldiers engaged in 25 fights with Germans and their collaborators. The number of soldiers from the Stowbtsy Group killed in action in the Piotrków and Kielce regions is estimated at 29.

=== Fates of other groups of Dolina ===
The 25th Home Army Infantry Regiment was not the only partisan group in which soldiers from the Stowbtsy Group, who survived the defeat at Jaktorów, fought. 66 soldiers from the Kampinos Group, including 43 from the Naliboki, joined the ranks of the II Battalion of the 3rd Home Army Legions Infantry Regiment, commanded by Lieutenant Antoni Heda, codenamed Szary. Under Szary's command, Dolina's unit fought against both the Germans and the communist authorities.

Dolina's group also fought in Home Army units operating in the Włoszczowa County. A squad under the command of Cadet Officer Stefan Sudnik, codenamed Sowa, even reached Podhale, where they joined the People's Security Guard unit led by Józef Kuraś, codenamed Ogień.

== After the war ==
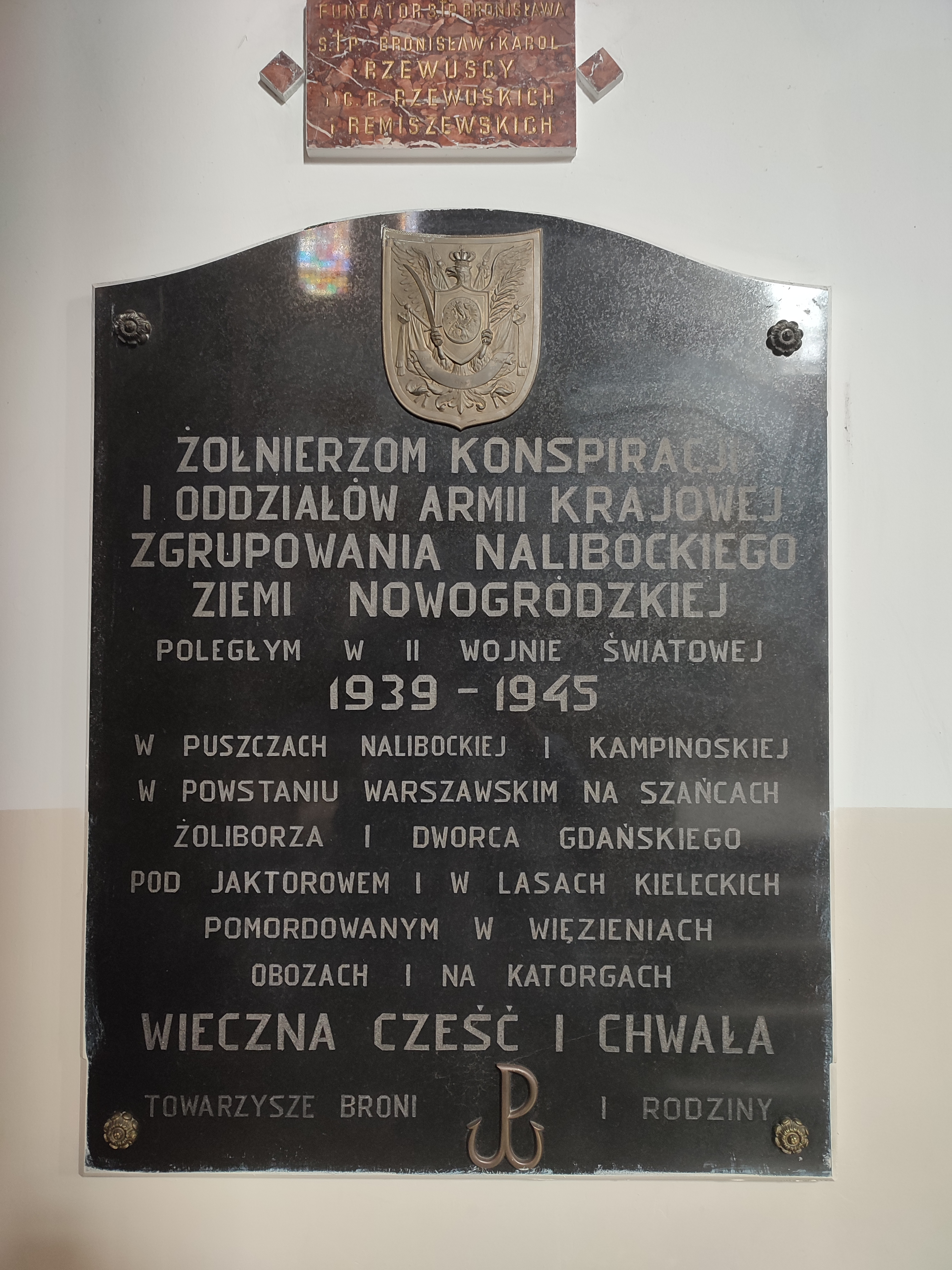
Plaque in the St. Stanislaus Kostka Church in Warsaw commemorating the soldiers of the Stowbtsy-Naliboki Group

After the war, some soldiers of the Stowbtsy Group became involved in anti-communist underground activities. Cadet Officer Józef Mioduszewski, codenamed Kłos/Zawieja, organized a partisan cavalry squadron, which continued fighting under the Self-Defense Movement of the Home Army and the Nation until the end of 1945. Dolina's soldiers also participated in the famous Raid on Kielce Prison, carried out by Lieutenant Antoni Heda's unit on the night of 4/5 August 1945.

During the Stalinist period, former soldiers of the Stowbtsy-Naliboki Group were persecuted by the security apparatus of the Polish People's Republic. Two Dolina's soldiers, Konstanty Downar and Donat Warakso, were sentenced to death and executed for belonging to the clandestine Polish Military Union (1947). Sergeant Józef Pacejkowicz, codenamed Groźny, was murdered in the Security Office prison in Prudnik. The commander of the Naliboki cavalry, Captain Zdzisław Nurkiewicz, codenamed Noc/Nieczaj, was sentenced to death by the Provincial Court in Zielona Góra in 1959, a sentence later commuted to 15 years in prison by the Supreme Court (he spent 10 years in prison and was rehabilitated in 2005). The case of Nieczaj, accused of collaborating with the Germans and murdering Soviet and Jewish partisans, was the last trial of a Home Army soldier in the Polish People's Republic.

Many soldiers of the Stowbtsy-Naliboki Group remained in exile after the war. Among them were numerous officers: Adolf Pilch, Witold Pełczyński, Franciszek Rybka, Zygmunt Koc, Jarosław Gąsiewski, Jan Jakubowski, and Józef Niedźwiecki.

The military effort of the Stowbtsy Group was either ignored or distorted by official historiography and the mass media during the Polish People's Republic. Accusations of collaboration and avoiding combat with the Germans were made against Lieutenant Pilch and his soldiers in books and articles published as late as the 1980s. According to Marian Podgóreczny, the history of the Stowbtsy Group remained largely forgotten and underappreciated even after the political breakthrough of 1989.

=== Commemoration ===
- Adolf Pilch's name is borne by primary schools in Dziekanów Polski and Wisła, and by streets in Trzcianka and Warsaw. The school in Libiszów is named after the Home Army Partisan Unit "Doliniacy".
- On the grounds of the school in Dziekanów Polski, there is a plaque commemorating the presence of soldiers from the Stowbtsy-Naliboki Group in the village.
- Inside the St. Stanislaus Kostka Church in Warsaw's Żoliborz district, there is a plaque commemorating the soldiers of the Stowbtsy-Naliboki Group.
- In the partisan cemetery in Wiersze, there is a plaque commemorating the soldiers of the 27th Home Army Uhlan Regiment.

== Bibliography ==
- Bielański, Ryszard (2007). "Góra – Dolina" Adolf Pilch (in Polish). Warsaw: Rytm. ISBN 978-83-7399-255-9.
- Bonarowski, Ryszard (2014). Burza nad Dworcem Gdańskim. W bój – bez broni (in Polish). Kraków: Oficyna Wydawnicza Mireki. ISBN 978-83-64452-09-3.
- Boradyn, Zygmunt (2013). Niemen rzeka niezgody. Polsko-sowiecka wojna partyzancka na Nowogródczyźnie 1943–1944 (in Polish). Warsaw: Rytm. ISBN 978-83-7399-434-8.
- Grzybowski, Witold (2014). "Spis żołnierzy Zgrupowania Stołpecko-Nalibockiego Armii Krajowej" (PDF). iwieniec.eu (in Polish).
- Jasiński, Grzegorz (2009). Żoliborz 1944 (in Polish). Pruszków: Ajaks. ISBN 978-83-62046-03-4.
- Kołosowski, Longin; Grzybowski, Witold (2007). "Zgrupowanie Stołpecko – Nalibockie AK" (PDF). iwieniec.eu (in Polish).
- Koszada, Jerzy (2007). "Grupa Kampinos". Partyzanckie zgrupowanie Armii Krajowej walczące w Powstaniu Warszawskim (in Polish). Warsaw: ZP GRUPA Sp. z o.o. ISBN 978-83-925916-6-5.
- Krajewski, Kazimierz (2006). "Oddziały Nowogródzkiego Okręgu AK w Powstaniu Warszawskim". In Krajewski, Kazimierz; Łabuszewski, Tomasz (eds.). Powstanie Warszawskie. Fakty i mity (in Polish). Warsaw: Instytut Pamięci Narodowej. ISBN 83-60464-03-0.
- Krajewski, Kazimierz (2013). "Powstanie iwienieckie i zapomniane boje w Puszczy Nalibockiej". Biuletyn Informacyjny AK (in Polish). 5.
- Krzyczkowski, Józef (1962). Konspiracja i powstanie w Kampinosie (in Polish). Warsaw: Ludowa Spółdzielnia Wydawnicza.
- Nowak, Szymon (2011). Puszcza Kampinoska – Jaktorów 1944 (in Polish). Warsaw: Bellona. ISBN 978-83-11-12141-6.
- Pilch, Adolf (2013). Partyzanci trzech puszcz (in Polish). Kraków: Oficyna Wydawnicza Mireki. ISBN 978-83-89533-92-0.
- Podgóreczny, Marian (2010). Doliniacy (in Polish). Vol. I, II, III. Warsaw: BMT ERIDIA. ISBN 978-83-930539-3-3.
- Podgóreczny, Marian (2010). Zgrupowanie Stołpecko – Nalibockie AK: oszczerstwa i fakty. Wywiad z dowódcą Zgrupowania cichociemnym mjr. Adolfem Pilchem ps. "Góra", "Dolina" (in Polish). Sopot: Iwieniec.
- Sawicki, Jacek Zygmunt (2002). "Obroża" w konspiracji i Powstaniu Warszawskim. Dzieje Armii Krajowej na przedpolu Warszawy (in Polish). Warsaw: Bellona. ISBN 83-11-09407-1.
