= Cisie, Wołomin County =

Cisie
- Village
- Location within Poland
- Coordinates: 52°29′58″N 21°11′55″E
- Country: Poland
- Voivodeship: Masovian
- County: Wołomin
- Gmina: Dąbrówka
- Population: 78

Cisie [ˈt͡ɕiɕɛ] is a village in the administrative district of Gmina Dąbrówka, within Wołomin County, Masovian Voivodeship, in east-central Poland.
