= Stasiopole =

- Village
- Location within Poland
- Coordinates: 52°31′N 21°12′E
- Country: Poland
- Voivodeship: Masovian
- County: Wołomin
- Gmina: Dąbrówka

Stasiopole [staɕɔˈpɔlɛ] is a village in the administrative district of Gmina Dąbrówka, within Wołomin County, Masovian Voivodeship, in east-central Poland.
