= Kuligów =

- Village
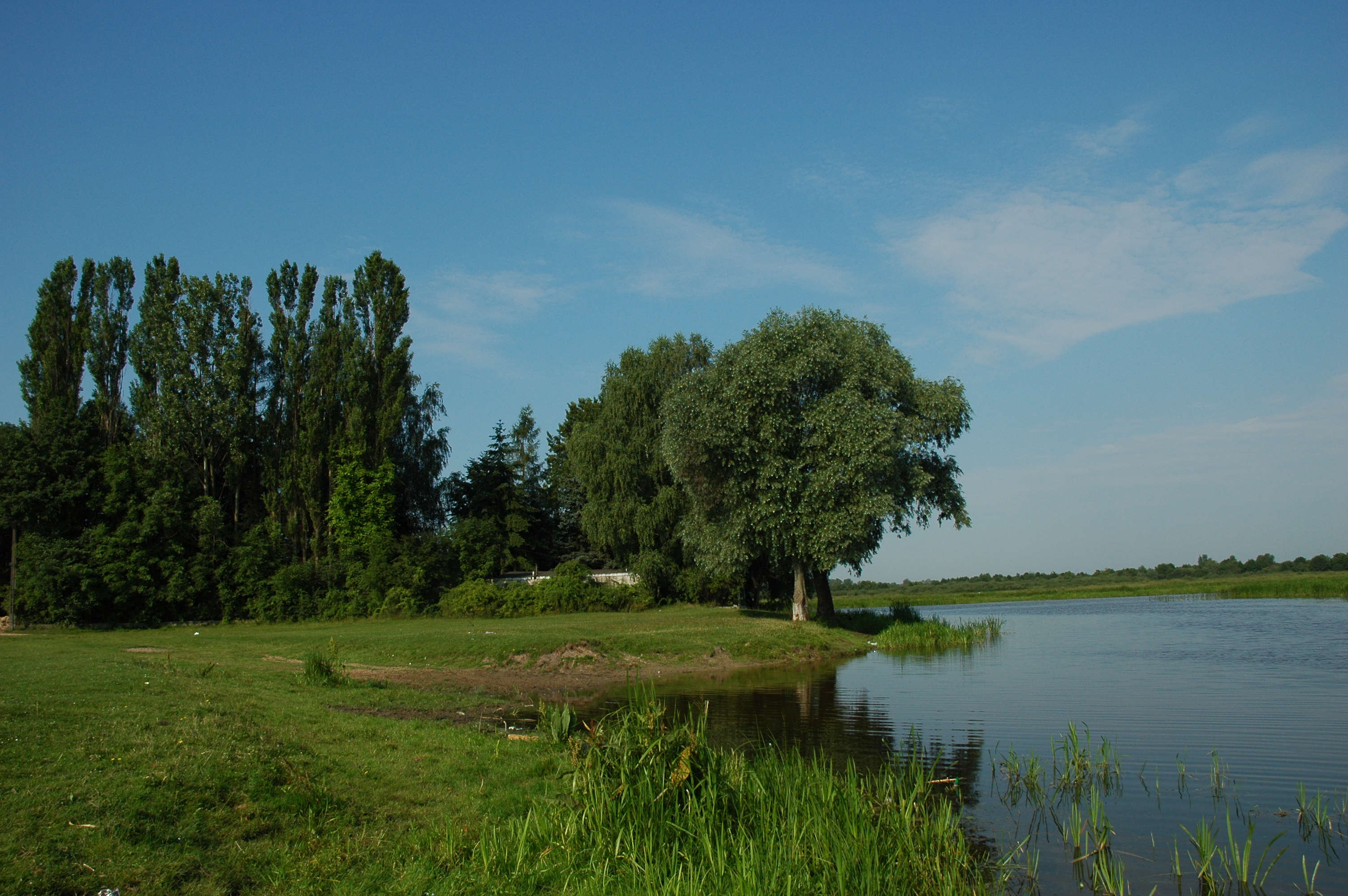
- Bug River in Kuligów

- Location within Poland
- Coordinates: 52°30′35″N 21°10′35″E
- Country: Poland
- Voivodeship: Masovian
- County: Wołomin
- Gmina: Dąbrówka
- Population: 394

Kuligów [kuˈliɡuf] is a village in the administrative district of Gmina Dąbrówka, within Wołomin County, Masovian Voivodeship, in east-central Poland.

The village lies on the Bug River.
