= Karolew, Gmina Dąbrówka =

Karolew
- Village
- Location within Poland
- Coordinates: 52°27′28″N 21°23′7″E
- Country: Poland
- Voivodeship: Masovian
- County: Wołomin
- Gmina: Dąbrówka

Karolew [kaˈrɔlɛf] is a village in the administrative district of Gmina Dąbrówka, within Wołomin County, Masovian Voivodeship, in east-central Poland.
