= Chruściele, Wołomin County =

Chruściele
- Village
- Location within Poland
- Coordinates: 52°27′N 21°21′E
- Country: Poland
- Voivodeship: Masovian
- County: Wołomin
- Gmina: Dąbrówka

Chruściele [xruˈɕt͡ɕɛlɛ] is a village in the administrative district of Gmina Dąbrówka, within Wołomin County, Masovian Voivodeship, in east-central Poland.
