= Wszebory, Wołomin County =

Wszebory
- Village
- Location within Poland
- Coordinates: 52°29′N 21°22′E
- Country: Poland
- Voivodeship: Masovian
- County: Wołomin
- Gmina: Dąbrówka

Wszebory [fʂɛˈbɔrɨ] is a village in the administrative district of Gmina Dąbrówka, within Wołomin County, Masovian Voivodeship, in east-central Poland.
