= Józefów, Gmina Dąbrówka =

Józefów
- Village
- Location within Poland
- Coordinates: 52°30′11″N 21°13′2″E
- Country: Poland
- Voivodeship: Masovian
- County: Wołomin
- Gmina: Dąbrówka

Józefów (Polish pronunciation: [juˈzɛfuf]) is a village in the administrative district of Gmina Dąbrówka, within Wołomin County, Masovian Voivodeship, in east-central Poland.
