= Slezany =

Slezany may refer to:

- Ślęzany, Silesian Voivodeship, Poland
- Ślężany, Masovian Voivodeship, Poland
