= Stanisławów, Wołomin County =

Stanisławów
- Village
- Location within Poland
- Coordinates: 52°29′02″N 21°15′57″E
- Country: Poland
- Voivodeship: Masovian
- County: Wołomin
- Gmina: Dąbrówka

Stanisławów [staɲiˈswavuf] is a village in the administrative district of Gmina Dąbrówka, within Wołomin County, Masovian Voivodeship, in east-central Poland.
