= Ostrówek, Gmina Dąbrówka =

Ostrówek
- Village
- Location within Poland
- Coordinates: 52°29′17″N 21°13′15″E
- Country: Poland
- Voivodeship: Masovian
- County: Wołomin
- Gmina: Dąbrówka
- Population: 157

Ostrówek [ɔˈstruvɛk] is a village in the administrative district of Gmina Dąbrówka, within Wołomin County, Masovian Voivodeship, in east-central Poland. The village had a population of 157 as of 2023.
