= Karpin, Masovian Voivodeship =

Karpin
- Village
- Location within Poland
- Coordinates: 52°29′N 21°19′E
- Country: Poland
- Voivodeship: Masovian
- County: Wołomin
- Gmina: Dąbrówka

Karpin [ˈkarpin] is a village in the administrative district of Gmina Dąbrówka, within Wołomin County, Masovian Voivodeship, in east-central Poland.
