= Czarnów, Wołomin County =

Czarnów
- Village
- Location within Poland
- Coordinates: 52°31′N 21°13′E
- Country: Poland
- Voivodeship: Masovian
- County: Wołomin
- Gmina: Dąbrówka
- Population (approx.): 150

Czarnów [ˈt͡ʂarnuf] is a village in the administrative district of Gmina Dąbrówka, within Wołomin County, Masovian Voivodeship, in east-central Poland.
