= Działy Czarnowskie =

- Village
- Location within Poland
- Coordinates: 52°28′32″N 21°14′31″E
- Country: Poland
- Voivodeship: Masovian
- County: Wołomin
- Gmina: Dąbrówka

Działy Czarnowskie [ˈd͡ʑawɨ t͡ʂarˈnɔfskʲɛ] is a village in the administrative district of Gmina Dąbrówka, within Wołomin County, Masovian Voivodeship, in east-central Poland.
