= Guzowatka, Wołomin County =

Guzowatka
- Village
- Location within Poland
- Coordinates: 52°28′N 21°14′E
- Country: Poland
- Voivodeship: Masovian
- County: Wołomin
- Gmina: Dąbrówka
- Population: 373

Guzowatka [ɡuzɔˈvatka] is a village in the administrative district of Gmina Dąbrówka, within Wołomin County, Masovian Voivodeship, in east-central Poland.
