= Trojany, Masovian Voivodeship =

Trojany
- Village
- Location within Poland
- Coordinates: 52°28′21″N 21°20′05″E
- Country: Poland
- Voivodeship: Masovian
- County: Wołomin
- Gmina: Dąbrówka
- Population: 490

Trojany [trɔˈjanɨ] is a village in the administrative district of Gmina Dąbrówka, within Wołomin County, Masovian Voivodeship, in east-central Poland.
