= Gmina Dąbrówka =

Gmina Dąbrówka Dąbrówka Commune
- Gmina
- Coat of arms

- Location within Poland
- Coordinates (Dąbrówka): 52°29′N 21°18′E
- Country: Poland
- Voivodeship: Masovian
- County: Wołomin
- Seat: Dąbrówka

Area
  - Total: 109.05 km^{2} (42.10 sq mi)

Population (2013)
  - Total: 7,772
  - Density: 71.27/km^{2} (184.6/sq mi)
- Website: http://www.dabrowka.net.pl

Gmina Dąbrówka is a rural gmina (administrative district) in Wołomin County, Masovian Voivodeship, in east-central Poland. Its seat is the village of Dąbrówka.

The gmina covers an area of 109.05 square kilometres (42.1 sq mi), and as of 2006 its total population is 6,921 (7,772 in 2013).

== Villages ==
Gmina Dąbrówka contains the villages and settlements of Chajęty, Chruściele, Cisie, Czarnów, Dąbrówka, Dręszew, Działy Czarnowskie, Guzowatka, Józefów, Karolew, Karpin, Kołaków, Kowalicha, Kuligów, Lasków, Ludwinów, Małopole, Marianów, Ostrówek, Ślężany, Sokołówek, Stanisławów, Stasiopole, Teodorów, Trojany, Wszebory and Zaścienie.

== Neighbouring gminas ==
Gmina Dąbrówka is bordered by the gminas of Klembów, Radzymin, Somianka, Tłuszcz, Wyszków and Zabrodzie.
