= Dąbrówka, Wołomin County =

Dąbrówka
- Village
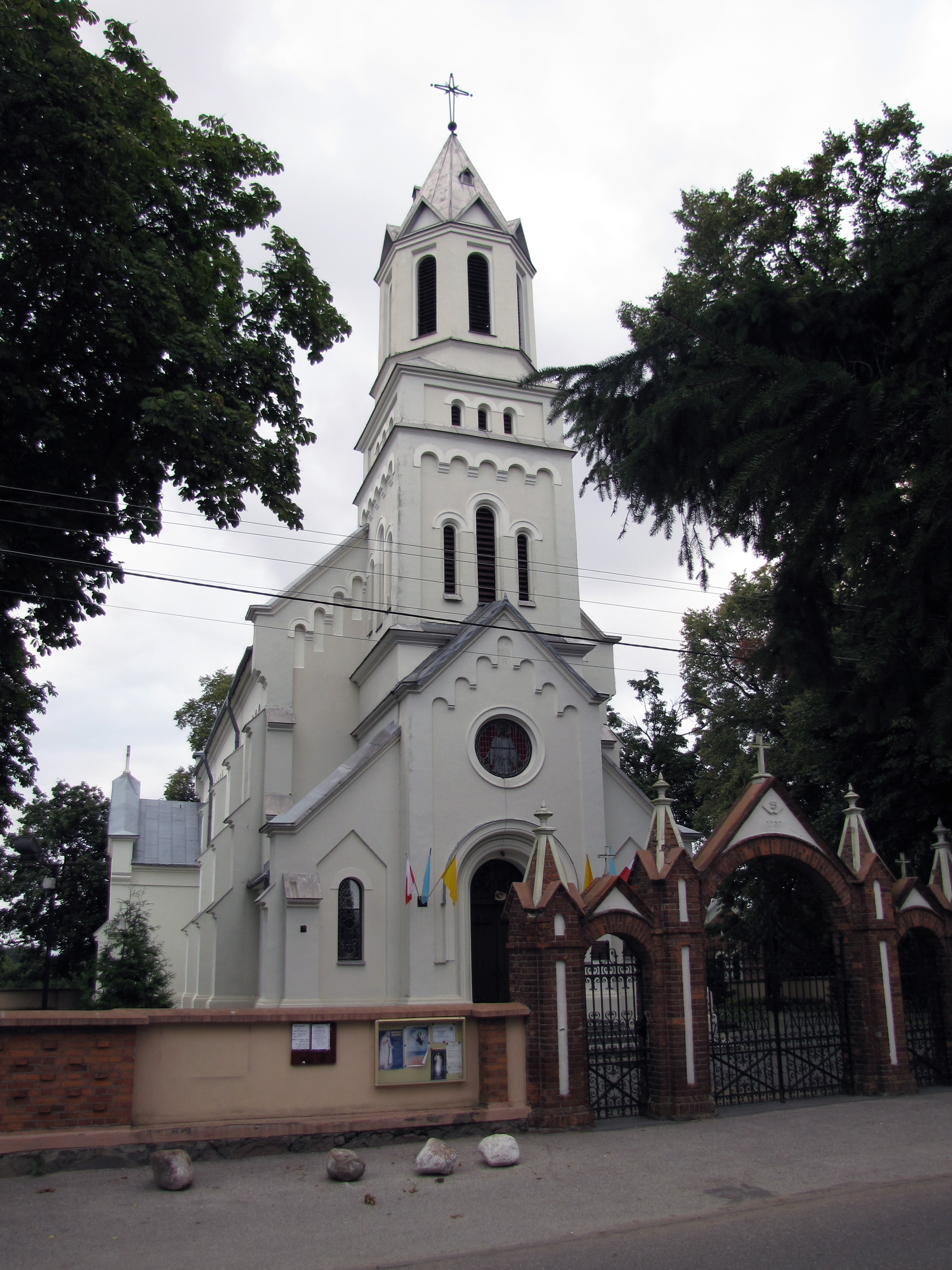
- Exaltation of the Holy Cross church in Dąbrówka

- Location within Poland
- Coordinates: 52°29′N 21°18′E
- Country: Poland
- Voivodeship: Masovian
- County: Wołomin
- Gmina: Dąbrówka

Population
  - Total: 535
- Time zone: UTC+1 (CET)
  - Summer (DST): UTC+2 (CEST)

Dąbrówka [dɔmˈbrufka] is a village in Wołomin County, Masovian Voivodeship, in east-central Poland. It is the seat of the gmina (administrative district) called Gmina Dąbrówka.
