= Marianów, Wołomin County =

Marianów
- Village
- Location within Poland
- Coordinates: 52°30′52″N 21°16′26″E
- Country: Poland
- Voivodeship: Masovian
- County: Wołomin
- Gmina: Dąbrówka

Marianów [maˈrjanuf] is a village in the administrative district of Gmina Dąbrówka, within Wołomin County, Masovian Voivodeship, in east-central Poland.
