= Dubniki =

Dubniki Дубники
- Village
- Location within Ivanovo Oblast Location within Russia
- Coordinates: 56°56′N 41°09′E
- Country: Russia
- Region: Ivanovo Oblast
- District: Ivanovsky District
- Time zone: UTC+3:00

Dubniki (Russian: Дубники) is a rural locality (a village) in Ivanovsky District, Ivanovo Oblast, Russia. Population: 15 (2010 census); 7 (2002 census);

== Geography ==
This rural locality is located 13 km from Ivanovo (the district's administrative centre and capital of Ivanovo Oblast) and 252 km from Moscow. Ormovo-Maloye is the nearest rural locality.
