= Wołomin County =

Wołomin County Powiat wołomiński
- County
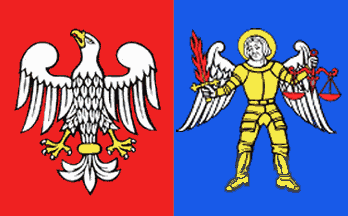
- Flag Coat of arms

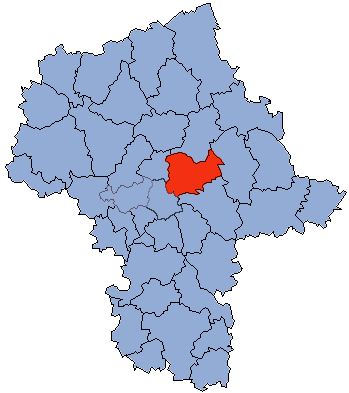
- Location within the voivodeship

- Division into gminas
- Coordinates (Wołomin): 52°21′N 21°14′E
- Country: Poland
- Voivodeship: Masovian
- Seat: Wołomin
- Gminas: Total 12 (incl. 4 urban): Kobyłka; Marki; Ząbki; Zielonka; Gmina Dąbrówka; Gmina Jadów; Gmina Klembów; Gmina Poświętne; Gmina Radzymin; Gmina Strachówka; Gmina Tłuszcz; Gmina Wołomin

Area
  - Total: 955.37 km^{2} (368.87 sq mi)

Population (2019)
  - Total: 247,288
  - Density: 258.84/km^{2} (670.39/sq mi)
  - Urban: 171,825
  - Rural: 75,463
- Car plates: WWL, WV
- Website: www.powiat-wolominski.pl

Wołomin County (Polish: powiat wołomiński) is a territorial and administrative division in Masovian Voivodeship, east-central Poland. It came into being on January 1, 1999, as a result of the Polish local government reforms passed in 1998. The administrative seat of the county and also its largest town is Wołomin, which lies 22 kilometres (14 mi) north-east of Warsaw. The county contains six other towns: Ząbki, 11 km (7 mi) south-west of Wołomin, Marki, 10 km (6 mi) west of Wołomin, Kobyłka, 3 km (2 mi) south-west of Wołomin, Zielonka, 8 km (5 mi) south-west of Wołomin, Radzymin, 9 km (6 mi) north-west of Wołomin, and Tłuszcz, 18 km (11 mi) north-east of Wołomin.

The county covers an area of 955.37 square kilometres (368.9 sq mi). As of 2019 its total population is 247,288, out of which the population of Wołomin is 37,082, that of Ząbki is 37,219, that of Marki is 34,679, that of Kobyłka is 24,096, that of Zielonka is 17,588, that of Radzymin is 13,005, that of Tłuszcz is 8,156, and the rural population is 75,463.

== Neighbouring counties ==
Wołomin County is bordered by Wyszków County to the north, Węgrów County to the east, Mińsk County to the south-east, the city of Warsaw to the south-west and Legionowo County to the west.

== Administrative divisions ==
The county is subdivided into 12 gminas (four urban, three urban-rural and five rural). These are listed in the following table, in descending order of population.

Gmina	Type	Area (km^{2})	Population (2019)	Seat
Gmina Wołomin	urban-rural	59.5	51,884	Wołomin
Ząbki	urban	11.1	37,219	
Marki	urban	26.0	34,679	
Gmina Radzymin	urban-rural	130.9	27,255	Radzymin
Kobyłka	urban	20.1	24,096	
Gmina Tłuszcz	urban-rural	102.8	20,051	Tłuszcz
Zielonka	urban	79.2	17,588	
Gmina Klembów	rural	85.8	9,908	Klembów
Gmina Dąbrówka	rural	109.1	8,134	Dąbrówka
Gmina Jadów	rural	116.9	7,533	Jadów
Gmina Poświętne	rural	106.3	6,211	Poświętne
Gmina Strachówka	rural	107.7	2,730	Strachówka
