= Równe =

Równe may refer to:

- Polish name for Rivne in Ukraine
- Równe, Masovian Voivodeship (east-central Poland)
- Równe, Opole Voivodeship (south-west Poland)
- Równe, Podkarpackie Voivodeship (south-east Poland)
- Równe, Pomeranian Voivodeship (north Poland)
- Równe, West Pomeranian Voivodeship (north-west Poland)
