= Memorial to the Partisans of the Mordechai Anielewicz Division of the People's Guard =

Monument in Warsaw, Poland

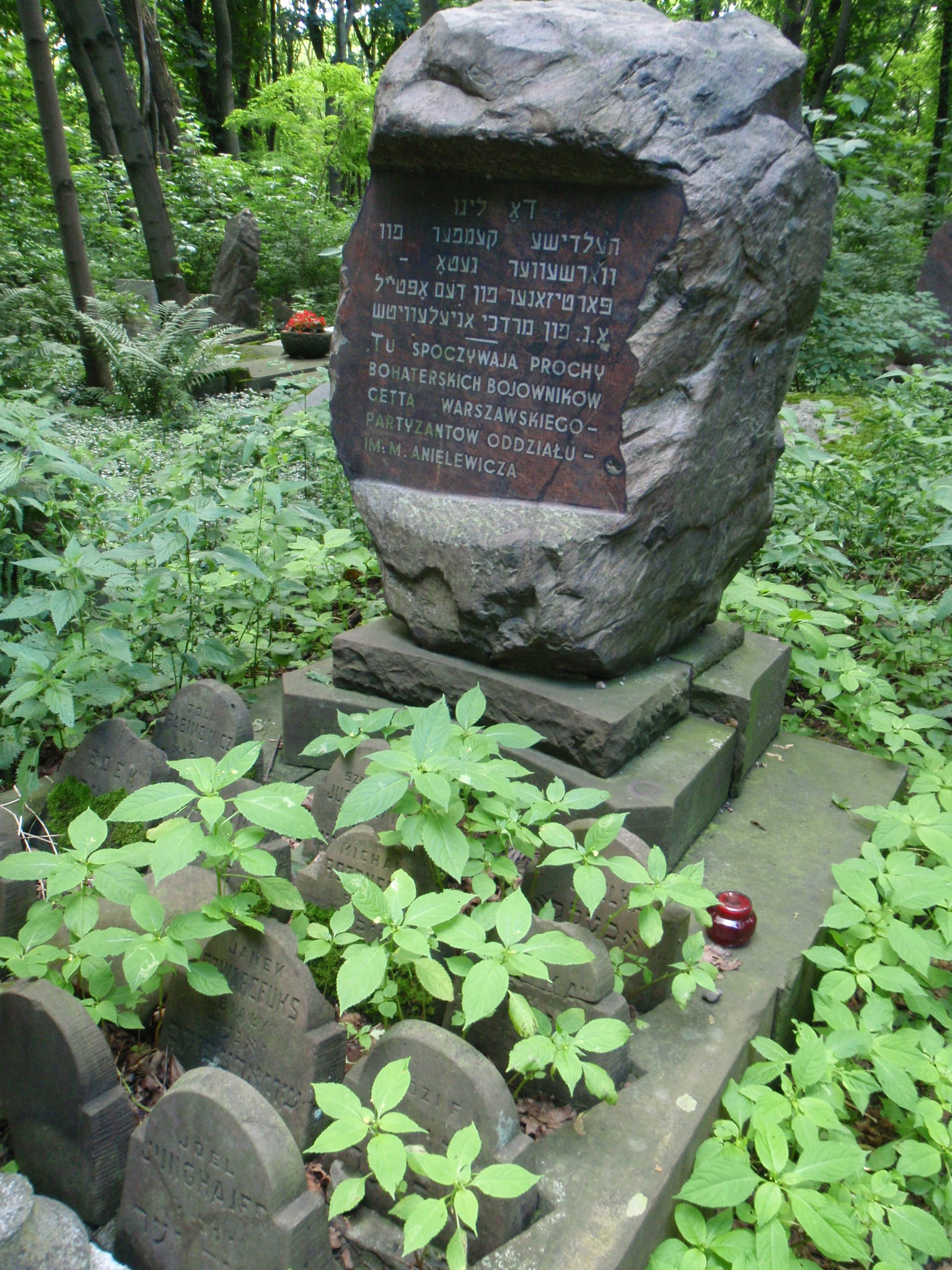
General view of the monument

Monument to the guerrilla fighters of the Mordechai Anielewicz Unit of the People's Guard (Polish: Pomnik partyzantów oddziału GL im. Mordechaja Anielewicza) is a monument located in the Jewish cemetery on Okopowa Street in Warsaw, commemorating the Warsaw Ghetto insurgents who were executed in Krawcowizna by the Germans.

== Description ==
The modest monument is located in the main alley of the cemetery (quarter 31, row 3). It consists of a boulder with a commemorative plaque and three rows of four red sandstone plaques each. The plaques bear the names or pseudonyms of those who were killed during the war: Adek Jankielewicz, Szmulek Juszkiewicz, Joel Junghajer, Józef Papier, Tola Rabinowicz, Michał Rozenfeld, Janek Szwarcfus, Chaim "Cyrenaika", Unknown alias "Edek", Unknown alias "Rachelka", Unknown alias "Rutka", Unknown alias "Stefan".

The monument stands on the grave of a group of Jewish fighters who, having escaped from the city after the fall of the uprising, took shelter in forests near Wyszków. There, they joined the team of Adam Szwarcfus alias "Janek", a member of the Mordechai Anielewicz Unit of the People's Guard. The team destroyed a German railway transport near the village of Urle in August 1943. After this successful operation they withdrew to Krawcowizna, where they were surrounded by a German unit brought in by a local forest ranger. Only two partisans survived. After the war, the forest ranger was sentenced to death for his actions. Other teams of the Mordechai Anielewicz Unit were murdered in the years 1943-1944 by, among others, the NSZ unit.
