= Michał Rozenfeld =

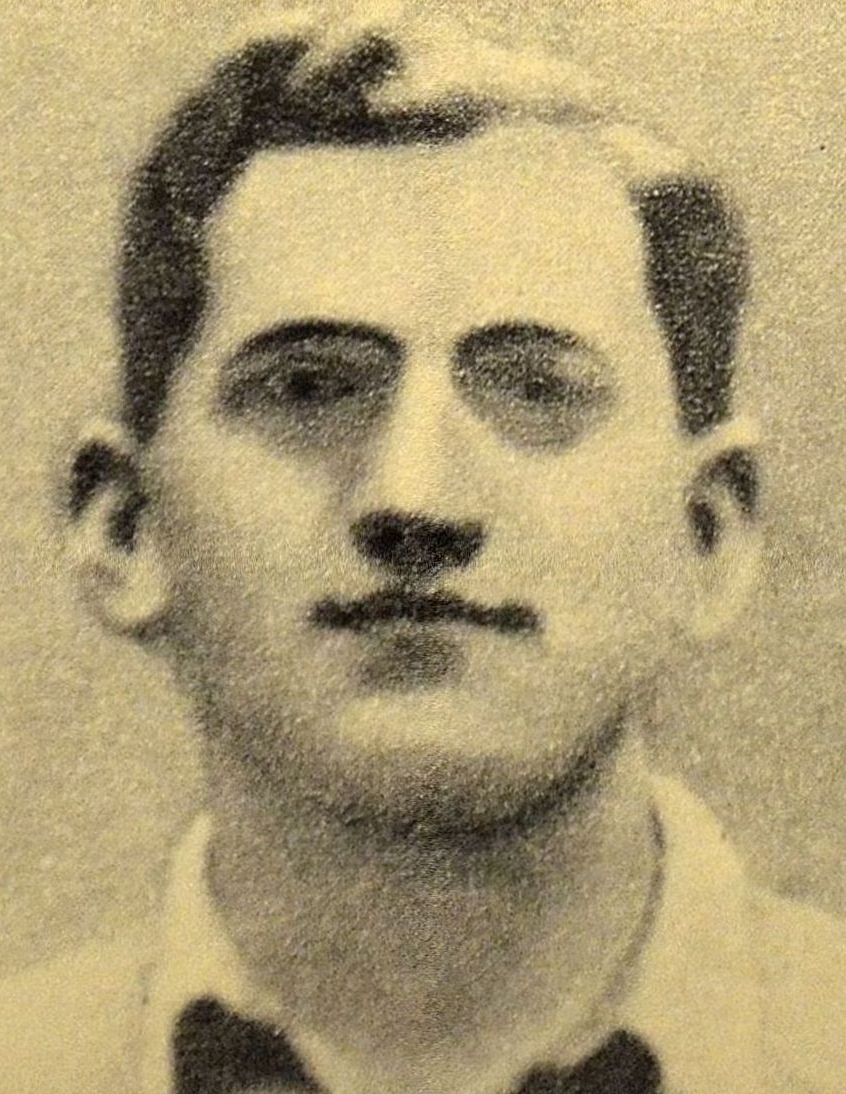
Michał Rozenfeld

Michał Rozenfeld (1916 – September 2, 1943) – a Jewish resistance activist during the Second World War, participant of the Warsaw Ghetto Uprising, partisan of the Mordechai Anielewicz Unit of the People's Guard.

Before the outbreak of the war, he studied psychology with, among others, Tadeusz Kotarbiński. After the outbreak of World War II, Rozenfeld was sent to the Warsaw Ghetto, where he worked as a teacher. He belonged to the Polish Workers' Party and was a member of the Main Command of the Jewish Combat Organization. He stayed in a bunker with Mordechai Anielewicz at 18 Miła Street. On May 18, 1943, together with a group of Jewish fighters, he got through the sewers to Prosta Street.

After the fall of the uprising, Rozenfeld took refuge in forests near Wyszków, where he fought in a unit of the People's Guard. Together with his companions he was handed over to the Germans by a forest ranger from Krawcowizna. Twelve partisans, including Michał Rozenfeld, were killed at that time.

In 1945 he was posthumously awarded the Silver Cross of the Order of Virtuti Militari.

Rozenfeld is buried in a mass grave of the People's Guard partisans in the Jewish cemetery on Okopowa Street in Warsaw (quarter 31, row 3).

== Honours ==
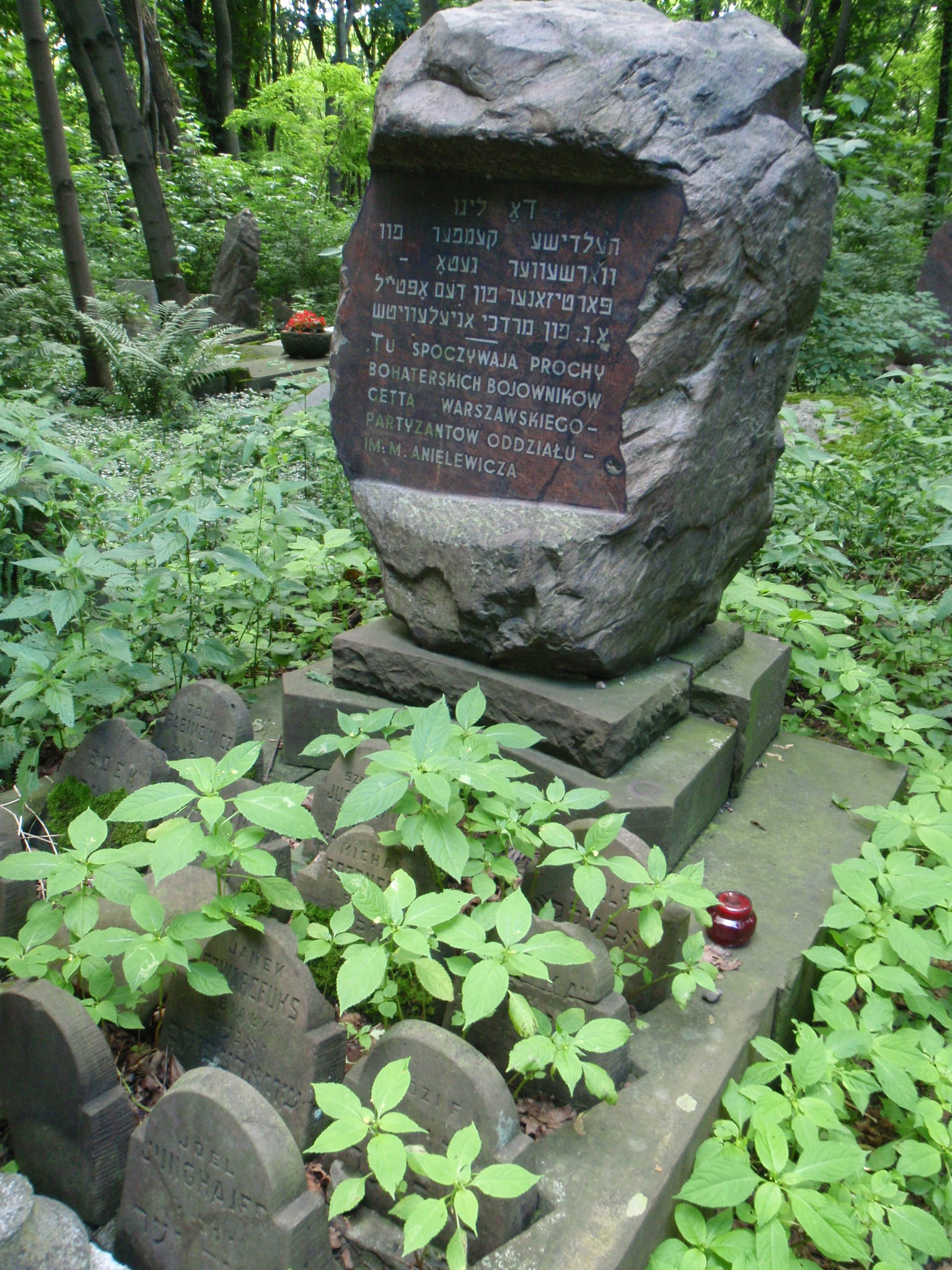
The grave of Michał Rozenfeld and his companions at the Jewish cemetery in Warsaw.

Michał Rozenfeld's name can be found on the commemorative plaque at the Monument to the evacuation of Warsaw Ghetto fighters at 51 Prosta Street in Warsaw.
