= Jadwisin, Wołomin County =

Jadwisin
- Village
- Location within Poland
- Coordinates: 52°27′N 21°38′E
- Country: Poland
- Voivodeship: Masovian
- County: Wołomin
- Gmina: Strachówka

Jadwisin [jadˈviɕin] is a village in the administrative district of Gmina Strachówka, within Wołomin County, Masovian Voivodeship, in east-central Poland.
