= Borzymy, Masovian Voivodeship =

Borzymy
- Village
- Location within Poland
- Coordinates: 52°30′N 21°38′E
- Country: Poland
- Voivodeship: Masovian
- County: Wołomin
- Gmina: Jadów

Borzymy [bɔˈʐɨmɨ] is a village in the administrative district of Gmina Jadów, within Wołomin County, Masovian Voivodeship, in east-central Poland.
