= Księżyki =

- Village
- Location within Poland
- Coordinates: 52°24′30″N 21°37′58″E
- Country: Poland
- Voivodeship: Masovian
- County: Wołomin
- Gmina: Strachówka

Księżyki [kɕɛ̃ˈʐɨki] is a village in the administrative district of Gmina Strachówka, within Wołomin County, Masovian Voivodeship, in east-central Poland.
