= Gmina Strachówka =

Gmina Strachówka Strachówka Commune
- Gmina
- Location within Poland
- Coordinates (Strachówka): 52°26′N 21°39′E
- Country: Poland
- Voivodeship: Masovian
- County: Wołomin
- Seat: Strachówka

Area
  - Total: 107.7 km^{2} (41.6 sq mi)

Population (2014)
  - Total: 2,816
  - Density: 26.15/km^{2} (67.72/sq mi)

Gmina Strachówka is a rural gmina (administrative district) in Wołomin County, Masovian Voivodeship, in east-central Poland. Its seat is the village of Strachówka, which lies approximately 30 kilometres (19 mi) east of Wołomin and 51 km (32 mi) north-east of Warsaw.

The gmina covers an area of 107.7 square kilometres (41.6 sq mi), and as of 2014 its total population is 2,816.

== Villages ==
Gmina Strachówka contains the villages and settlements of Annopol, Borucza, Grabszczyzna, Jadwisin, Józefów, Kąty Czernickie, Kąty-Miąski, Kąty-Wielgi, Krawcowizna, Księżyki, Marysin, Młynisko, Osęka, Piaski, Równe, Rozalin, Ruda-Czernik, Strachówka, Szamocin, Szlędaki, Wiktoria and Zofinin.

== Neighbouring gminas ==
Gmina Strachówka is bordered by the gminas of Dobre, Jadów, Korytnica, Poświętne, Stanisławów and Tłuszcz.
