= Myszadła =

- Village
- Location within Poland
- Coordinates: 52°29′N 21°43′E
- Country: Poland
- Voivodeship: Masovian
- County: Wołomin
- Gmina: Jadów
- Elevation: 107 m (351 ft)

Myszadła [mɨˈʂadwa] is a village in the administrative district of Gmina Jadów, within Wołomin County, Masovian Voivodeship, in east-central Poland.

The village has a humid continental climate (Dfb) according to the Köppen climate classification and the town is on the Eurasian Plate in Europe.
