= Kąty Czernickie =

- Village
- Location within Poland
- Coordinates: 52°22′N 21°36′E
- Country: Poland
- Voivodeship: Masovian
- County: Wołomin
- Gmina: Strachówka

Kąty Czernickie [ˈkɔntɨ t͡ʂɛrˈnit͡skʲɛ] is a village in the administrative district of Gmina Strachówka, within Wołomin County, Masovian Voivodeship, in east-central Poland.
