= Wójty =

- Village
- Location within Poland
- Coordinates: 52°29′N 21°39′E
- Country: Poland
- Voivodeship: Masovian
- County: Wołomin
- Gmina: Jadów
- Time zone: UTC+1 (CET)
  - Summer (DST): UTC+2 (CEST)

Wójty [ˈvui̯tɨ] is a village in the administrative district of Gmina Jadów, within Wołomin County, Masovian Voivodeship, in east-central Poland.

Eight Polish citizens were murdered by Nazi Germany in the village during World War II.
