= Józefów, Gmina Strachówka =

Józefów
- Village
- Location within Poland
- Coordinates: 52°26′34″N 21°41′24″E
- Country: Poland
- Voivodeship: Masovian
- County: Wołomin
- Gmina: Strachówka

Józefów (Polish pronunciation: [juˈzɛfuf]) is a village in the administrative district of Gmina Strachówka, within Wołomin County, Masovian Voivodeship, in east-central Poland.
