= Szamocin, Masovian Voivodeship =

Szamocin
- Village
- Location within Poland
- Coordinates: 52°23′57″N 21°42′39″E
- Country: Poland
- Voivodeship: Masovian
- County: Wołomin
- Gmina: Strachówka

Szamocin [ʂaˈmɔt͡ɕin] is a village in the administrative district of Gmina Strachówka, within Wołomin County, Masovian Voivodeship, in east-central Poland.
