= Dębe Wielkie, Wołomin County =

Dębe Duże
- Village
- Location within Poland
- Coordinates: 52°30′18″N 21°36′12″E
- Country: Poland
- Voivodeship: Masovian
- County: Wołomin
- Gmina: Jadów
- Population: 190 (2,011)

Dębe Duże [ˈdɛmbɛ ˈduzɛ] is a village in the administrative district of Gmina Jadów, within Wołomin County, Masovian Voivodeship, in east-central Poland.
