= Jadów =

Town in Masovian Voivodeship, Poland

- Town
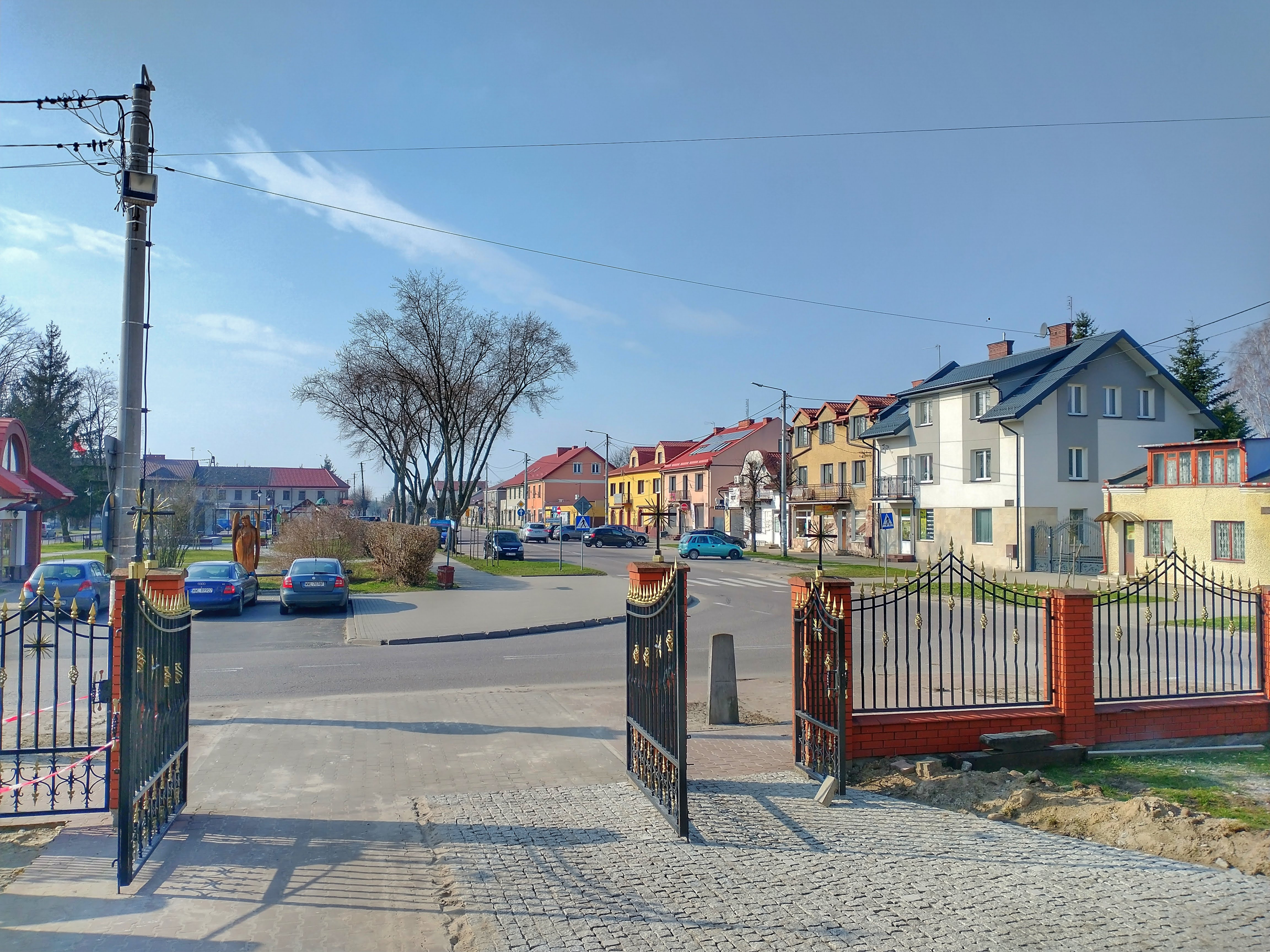
- The market square

- Coat of arms

- Location within Poland
- Coordinates: 52°28′N 21°38′E
- Country: Poland
- Voivodeship: Masovian
- County: Wołomin
- Gmina: Jadów

Population
  - Total: 1,200
- Time zone: UTC+1 (CET)
  - Summer (DST): UTC+2 (CEST)
- Vehicle registration: WWL

Jadów [ˈjaduf] is a town in Wołomin County, Masovian Voivodeship, in east-central Poland. It is the seat of the administrative district Gmina Jadów. It is situated on the Osownica River.

The town has a population of 1,200.

== History ==
The beginnings of Jadów are dated to the late Middle Ages. In 1475, thanks to its location by a trade route, Jadów obtained a market privilege and the right to organize fairs.

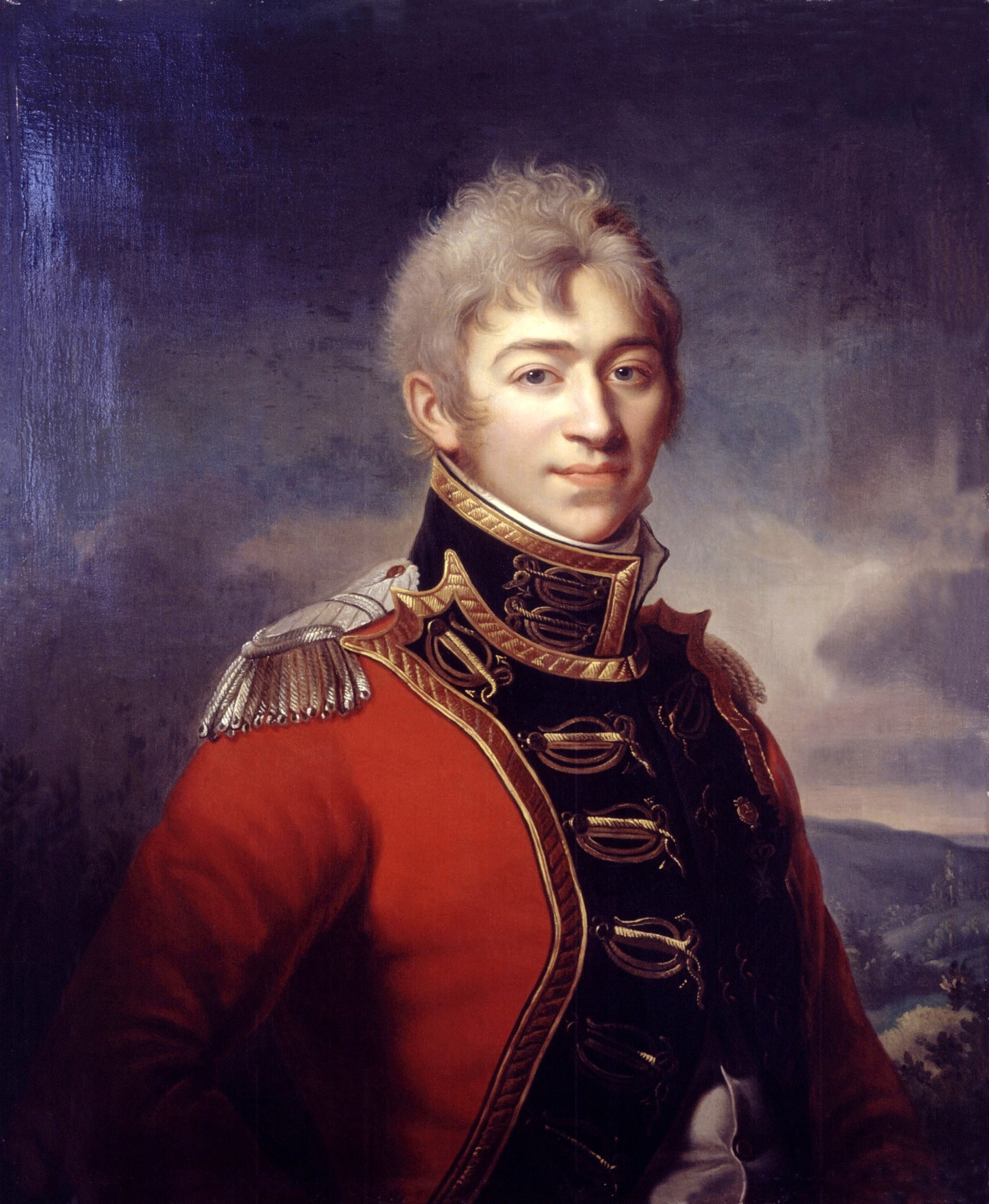
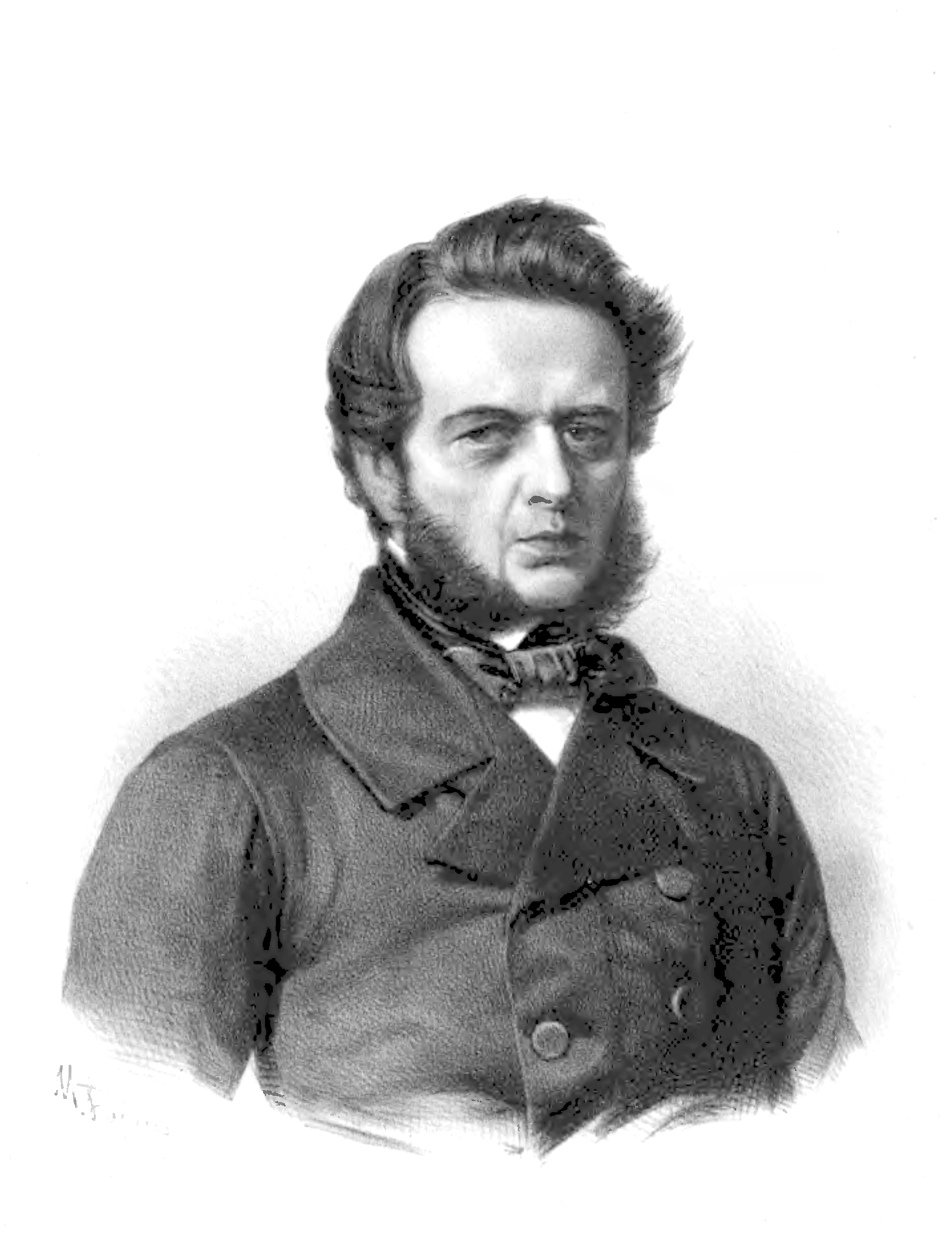
Stanisław Kostka Zamoyski and Andrzej Artur Zamoyski, benefactors of Jadów

Jadów formed part of an estate of the Zamoyski family. In 1823, the Zamoyski family established factories in Jadów that produced cloth, paper, and calico. Stanisław and Andrzej Zamoyski encouraged Scots to settle in Jadów to stimulate economic activity. In 1823 Jadów was granted town rights. Jews also settled in Jadów. As of 1861, Jews formed a minority of 42%. In 1870, Jadów was deprived of town rights as punishment for the unsuccessful Polish January Uprising, and then many Scots left.

According to the 1921 census, the population of Jadów with the adjacent manor farm was 57.8% Polish and 42.2% Jewish by declared nationality. The Zionist movement was present in the community.

With the occupation of the village by German troops in 1939, many restrictions were enforced on the Jewish population, including payments, wearing of a yellow badge on the arm, forced labor, amongst others. In September 1942, Operation Reinhard was enacted by Nazi German troops, where approximately 800 Jews were shot to death. The rest were sent to the Treblinka extermination camp.

In 2016, a local campaign led to the restoration of Jadów's Scottish cemetery and commemorations were organised.

== Architecture ==
In 1474 the first church was built by Bolesław IV. The most valuable part of the urban area is the small market square with tenement houses around.

== Transport ==
Jadów lies on vovoideship road 636 which connects it to Tłuszcz to the west and to Łochów to the north.

The nearest railway station is in Łochów.

== Notable people ==
- Gustaw Orlicz-Dreszer (1889–1936), Polish general, and political and social activist.
