= Dębe Małe, Wołomin County =

Dębe Małe
- Village
- Location within Poland
- Coordinates: 52°29′42″N 21°35′09″E
- Country: Poland
- Voivodeship: Masovian
- County: Wołomin
- Gmina: Jadów

Dębe Małe [ˈdɛmbɛ ˈmawɛ] is a village in the administrative district of Gmina Jadów, within Wołomin County, Masovian Voivodeship, in east-central Poland.
