= Paul Zorner =

20th-century German fighter pilot

- Paul Zorner
- Born: Paul Zloch; 31 March 1920; Roben district of Leobschütz, Upper Silesia
- Died: 27 January 2014 (aged 93); Homburg
- Military career
- Allegiance: Nazi Germany (to 1945); West Germany
- Branch: Luftwaffe; German Air Force
- Service years: 1939–1945, 1956–1957
- Rank: Major
- Units: KGr.z.b.v. 104; NJG 2, NJG 3, NJG 5, NJG 100
- Commands: 8./NJG 3, III./NJG 5, II./NJG 100
- Conflicts: See battles World War II: Battle of Greece; Battle of Crete; Anglo-Iraqi War; Operation Barbarossa; Defence of the Reich
- Awards: Knight's Cross of the Iron Cross with Oak Leaves; Order of Merit of the Federal Republic of Germany
- Other work: mechanical engineering

Paul Anton Guido Zorner, born Paul Zloch (31 March 1920 – 27 January 2014), was a German night fighter pilot, who fought in the Luftwaffe during World War II. Zorner is credited with 59 night aerial victories claimed in 272 missions, including 110 night fighter missions. Zorner was the ninth most successful fighter pilot in the Luftwaffe and in the history of aerial warfare.

Born in 1920 to a large family, Zorner left school in 1938 to pursue a military career. He applied to join the Luftwaffe and was accepted as a Fahnenjunker (officer candidate) in October 1938. Zorner completed his training and was licensed to fly multi-engine aircraft. He was posted to 4. Staffel (squadron) Kampfgruppe zur besonderen Verwendung 104 (KGr. z.b.v. 104, Fighting Group for Special Use) to fly Junkers Ju 52 transports. Zorner participated in the Battle of Greece and Battle of Crete in April and May 1941. Zorner also operated in the Middle East flying supplies to Syria during the Anglo-Iraqi War. Zorner continued with the unit and from June to October 1941 flew in Operation Barbarossa, the invasion of the Soviet Union.

On 20 October 1941, Zorner transferred to the German night fighter arm. He completed his training as a night fighter pilot in July 1942 and was posted to Nachtjagdgeschwader 2. On 3 October 1942, Zorner was posted to 10. Staffel (squadron) Nachtjagdgeschwader 3 (NJG 3, Night Fighter Wing 3). Zorner claimed his first victory on 17 January 1943 and on 3 March, achieved the five victories necessary to qualify as a night fighter ace (Experte). On 9 September 1943 he was appointed Staffelkapitän (squadron leader) of 8./NJG 3 after achieving 12 victories. Zorner achieved his 20th victory on 3 January 1944 and was awarded the German Cross in Gold on 20 March 1944 for 35 night victories.

On 4 April 1944, Zorner was appointed Gruppenkommandeur (Group Commander) of III./Nachtjagdgeschwader 5 (NJG 5). On 9 June, Zorner was awarded the Knight's Cross of the Iron Cross for 48 bombers destroyed. Zorner was awarded the Knight's Cross of the Iron Cross with Oak Leaves on 17 September 1944. Zorner was appointed Gruppenkommandeur of II./NJG 100 on 13 October 1944 and remained the commanding officer until May 1945. Zorner achieved his 59th, and last, a victory on 5/6 March 1945.

Zorner surrendered to United States Army forces on 8 May 1945. Zorner and his unit were handed over to the Red Army on 17 May and he remained a prisoner in the Soviet Union until December 1949. After his release he studied engineering and retired in 1981. Zorner died in January 2014 aged 93.

== Early life ==
Paul Zorner was born on 31 March 1920 in Roben, Leobschütz, Upper Silesia. He was a son of head teachers and one of eight children. Zorner expressed an interest in Glider flying in his early years but the size of the family strained his parents' financial resources and he could not take up the hobby. In the spring, 1938 aged 18, Zorner passed his Abitur, school leaving certificate. Zorner desired a military flying career and he applied to join the Luftwaffe and was accepted as a Fahnenjunker (officer candidate) in October 1938.

On 8 November 1938 Zorner began his Flugzeugführerausbildung (pilot training) as a learner pilot at Oschatz-Sachsen. On 14 March 1939 he was accepted as Fähnrich and transferred to Berlin-Gatow. There, he completed the first stage of his officer training on 31 October 1939. Zorner progressed through the A/B Schools (elementary flying schools) and trained at the Flugzeugführerschule C in Lönnewitz to gain his pilot license on multi-engine aircraft from 1 November 1939 to the 30 June 1940. He was promoted to the officer rank Leutnant (Second Lieutenant) on 1 April 1940. (Note: Flight training in the Luftwaffe progressed through the levels A1, A2 and B1, B2, referred to as A/B flight training. A training included theoretical and practical training in aerobatics, navigation, long-distance flights and dead-stick landings. The B courses included high-altitude flights, instrument flights, night landings and training to handle the aircraft in difficult situations. For pilots destined to fly multi-engine aircraft, the training was completed with the Luftwaffe Advanced Pilot's Certificate (Erweiterter Luftwaffen-Flugzeugführerschein), also known as the C-Certificate.)

From 4–30 June 1940 Zorner was based at the Fluglehrerschule (flight instructor school) in Brandenburg and from the 1 July 1940 – 15 January 1941 he attended the Flugzeugführerschule C 11 to complete his advanced training. Zorner attended the Blindflugschule (Blind Flying School) at Neuburg an der Donau from 23 August–16 September 1940 to qualify for night flying.

== World War II ==
Zorner was posted to 4. Staffel (squadron) Kampfgruppe zur besonderen Verwendung 104 (KGr.z.b.v. 104—Fighting Group for Special Use) to fly the Junkers Ju 52 transport aircraft. The unit deployed to Athens, Greece in April 1941. It assisted in the airborne drop against Crete—Unternehmen Merkur (Operation Mercury). Zorner flew over 160 missions in the Mediterranean and North African theatre. The most notable action was the Anglo-Iraqi War in May 1941. KGr.z.b.v. 104 flew spare part supplies for Zerstörergeschwader 76 (Destroyer Wing 76) in Iraq. Zorner recorded transport flights from Athens to Aleppo. Zorner was awarded the Iron Cross Second Class on 6 June 1941 for his service. KGr.z.b.v. 104 then moved to Romania to participate in Operation Barbarossa, the invasion of the Soviet Union. It supported Army Group South in the initial assault but then disbanded in the autumn. Zorner left KGr.z.b.v. 104 on 8 October 1941.

=== Night fighter ===
A map of part of the Kammhuber Line. The 'belt' and night fighter 'boxes' are shown.

Following the 1939 aerial Battle of the Heligoland Bight, bombing missions by the Royal Air Force (RAF) shifted to the cover of darkness, initiating the Defence of the Reich campaign. By mid-1940, Generalmajor (Brigadier General) Josef Kammhuber had established a night air defense system dubbed the Kammhuber Line. It consisted of a series of control sectors equipped with radars and searchlights and an associated night fighter. Each sector, named a Himmelbett (canopy bed), would direct the night fighter into visual range with target bombers. In 1941, the Luftwaffe started equipping night fighters with airborne radar such as the Lichtenstein radar. This airborne radar did not come into general use until early 1942.

Zorner joined the German night fighter force on 20 October 1941 and was ordered to Schleißheim, Munich, to attend the Nachtjadgschule 1 (Night Fighter School 1) to begin conversion and night fighter training on the Messerschmitt Bf 110. At Schleißheim Zorner learned the rudiments of air combat and day fighter tactics which he completed on 28 December 1941. From 1 January 1942 Zorner undertook night fighter training Nachtjadgschule 1, at the Ingolstadt base. On 1 April 1942 he was promoted to Oberleutnant (First Lieutenant). He graduated on 20 May 1942. The final phase of training was completed with Ergänzungs-Nachtjagdgruppe (Supplementary Night Hunting Group) at Stuttgart.

Zorner was posted to 8. Staffel (squadron), II. Gruppe (Group) Nachtjagdgeschwader 2 (NJG 2—Night Fighter Wing 2) based at Gilze-Rijen Air Base in the Netherlands on 1 July 1942. On 3 October 1942 Zorner was moved again, this time to 10./Nachtjagdgeschwader 3 (NJG 3—Night Fighter Wing 3), at Grove, where he remained until 5 December 1942. The next day he was ordered to Wittmundhafen and appointed Staffelkapitän (squadron leader) of 2./NJG 3. Zorner held this command until 15 March 1943. The Staffel was equipped with the Dornier Do 217 night fighter. Zorner disliked flying the Dornier and lobbied his commanding officer, Gruppenkommandeur Egmont Prinz zur Lippe-Weißenfeld to fly the Bf 110. Lippe-Weißenfeld agreed on the condition that he flies both operationally in rotation with other units.

On the night of 17/18 January 1943 Air Officer Commanding (AOC) RAF Bomber Command, Arthur Harris ordered an attack on Berlin. 170 Avro Lancaster and 17 Handley-Page Halifax bombers carried out the operation. It was to be the last attack on the German capital until the H2S ground scanning radar became available. Zorner intercepted a Halifax 45 kilometres (28 miles) northwest of Juist and shot it down at 21:55. Zorner achieved this success on his 14th mission as a night fighter pilot.

Bomber Command attacked Wilhelmshaven with 177 aircraft—129 Lancaster, 40 Halifax and eight Short Stirlings on 11/12 February 1943. The Pathfinders found that the Wilhelmshaven area was covered by cloud. The British marked the target by parachute flares using H2S. The naval ammunition depot at Mariensiel to the south of Wilhelmshaven blew up and caused widespread damage in the naval dockyard and in the town. Zorner engaged a Lancaster 40 kilometres (25 miles) west northwest of Borkum and claimed it shot down over the North Sea. Zorner was the only pilot in the Luftwaffe to claim a victory on this night. One of the three crews lost in the operation flew in Lancaster I, DX-D, of No. 57 Squadron RAF. Sergeant K. T. Dutton and his six crewmembers disappeared and were listed "lost without trace."

After his second victory, Geschwaderkommodore Johann Schalk warned Zorner for leaving the Do 217s idle. On Zorner's next flight, he operated the type. Zorner claimed his third victory on 19 February, north of Norderney at 20:34. The bomber was recorded as a Douglas A-20 Havoc. During the engagement Zorner's Dornier sustained a hit in the wing and one through the starboard engine casing causing an oil leak, necessitating a forced landing on one engine. Although Zorner claimed a probable, an anti-aircraft artillery battery had witnessed the enemy bomber flying just above the sea before it disappeared into the mist. Since its recovery was deemed impossible, he was granted the victory. Zorner's victim was Vickers Wellington II, BJ1919 OW-P of No. 426 Squadron RAF piloted by Sergeant J. O. R. Gauthier. Sergeants H. R. Bailey, F. Ruzycki, R. C. Ramsay, Flight Sergeant R. W. Ferrier and Pilot Officer C. A. McKinnon, all of RCAF, were posted missing in action. The aircraft has never been found, and likely crashed into the North Sea. On the night of 26 February Zorner claimed a Short Stirling northwest of Schiermonnikoog at 20:46.

=== Ruhr and Baltic ===
Air Marshal Harris, AOC RAF Bomber Command escalated the air war in 1943 and began a concerted effort to destroy the industrial German Ruhr region through area bombing. From March to July 1943 Bomber Command began the campaign, dubbed the Battle of the Ruhr. Harris had 53 squadrons, 16 of which were medium bombers equipped with H2S terrain mapping radar. Zorner's first victory in the defence of the Ruhr came on the night of the 7/8 March 1943 northeast of Norden at 20:50 when he claimed a Wellington. The only other claimant was Karl-Heinz Scherfling. Zorner's victim was probably Wellington HE202, SE-Z, piloted by Sergeant Derek Cecil of No. 431 Squadron RAF. The bomber was conducting "Gardening" (minelaying operations) by the Frisian Islands when it was shot down. All five crewmen became prisoners of war.

Zorner claimed another Wellington on 13/14 March at 03:51, north of Norderney, one of only two claims. This machine was BK296, PT, from No. 420 Squadron RCAF. Pilot Flight Sergeant Charles Harrison Tidy and his crew were killed. Zorner was made Staffelkapitän of 8./NJG 3 two days later. In April 1943 Zorner was ordered to carry out two daylight operations against the United States Army Air Force (USAAF). Zorner found the task unsuitable for the Bf 110. A combat box of B-17 Flying Fortress bombers had eight firing positions and a formation of nine could muster over 100 guns. The Bf 110 was adjudged to be only 40 km/h (25 mph) faster and the most effective tactic, the head-on-attack, could only be executed three times for the aircraft could not position itself in front of the bomber formations quickly enough: the endurance of two hours forty-five minutes was not sufficient for these lengthy manoeuvres. On the second sortie he flew Lippe-Webenfeld's Bf 110 but was hit in both wings and engines and force-landed without success near Cloppenburg.

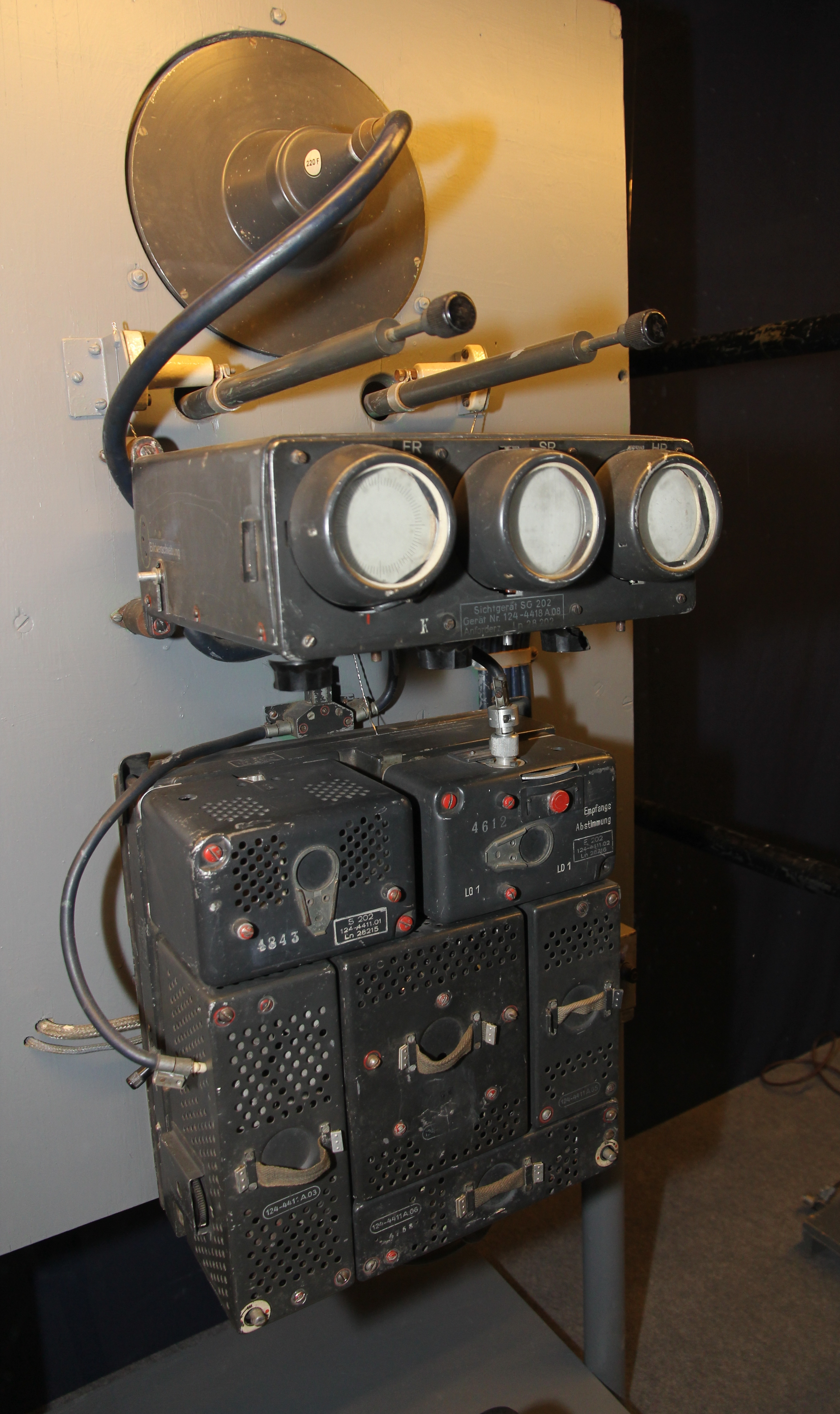
Lichtenstein cathode-ray tubes: • The left tube indicated other aircraft ahead as bumps. • The centre tube indicated range to a specific target and whether they were higher or lower. • The right tube indicated whether the target was to left or right.

Zorner claimed his 7th victory on 28/29 June southeast of Antwerp, Belgium at 02:20. It was recorded as a Halifax bomber. Another Wellington was claimed southwest of Sint-Truiden at 01:09. Zorner achieved his 10th victory west of Malmedy at 01:53. Zorner's 11th victory was shot down northeast of Groningen at 03:54 on 24/25 July. His victim was Lancaster R5573 flown by Flight Sergeant Kenneth Hector Wally McLean from No. 106 Squadron RAF. Zorner saw the Lancaster crash and explode which resulted in a fire-work display of green, red and white flashes. They assumed the aircraft to be a pathfinder, and the flashes exploding flares. Soon afterwards Zorner and his crewman had to abandon the Bf 110G-4 because an engine caught fire. Zorner extinguished the fire but he could no longer calibrate the propeller pitch to a glide setting. The other power plant could not cope with the added workload and the Bf 110 began to lose height. Zorner ordered his crew to leave. Zorner struggled to exit as his parachute snagged. He managed to clamber back into the cockpit and lower the flaps which slowed the aircraft and afforded him time to unhook the parachute from the strengthening beam in the cockpit and parachute to safety.

Zorner had to wait several weeks for another successful engagement. On 18 August 1943 Bomber Command carried out Operation Hydra, an attack on the Peenemünde Army Research Center. At 01:53 over the Baltic Sea Zorner claimed a Lancaster followed by another Lancaster over Peenemünde at 02:03—his 13th victory. It was his last victory with 3./NJG 3. On 9 September 1943 he was appointed Staffelkapitän of 8./NJG 3.

=== Battle of Berlin ===
At the beginning of November 1943 Zorner's Bf 110G was fitted with a FuG 220 Lichtenstein SN-2 radar. The new radar was not affected by "window". On the night of 18/19 November 1943 as RAF Bomber Command began their Berlin offensive and Zorner led 8. Staffel through his most successful period of operations. Operating from Lüneburg, Zorner scrambled to intercept 383 aircraft, 365 Lancaster, 10 Halifax and eight de Havilland Mosquito bombers which attacked Berlin on 23/24 November 1943. Zorner caught a Lancaster at 20:09 northwest of Berlin and dispatched the bomber for his 14th victory. On 2 December, Zorner accounted for two Lancaster bombers: one near Diepholz at 19:24 and southwest of Berlin at 20:29. On 20 December at 20:02 claimed a Lancaster. The location was recorded as "Hintetmeiligen". On 23/24 December 1943 Bomber Command returned to Berlin. Zorner claimed three Lancasters: one east of Giessen at 03:02, another south of Diepholz at 05:43 and a third at 06:02 over Cloppenburg. One of the bombers was Avro Lancaster III ED999, KM-X, from No. 44 Squadron RAF, piloted by Sergeant R. L. Hands. Hands and his crew were killed in action.

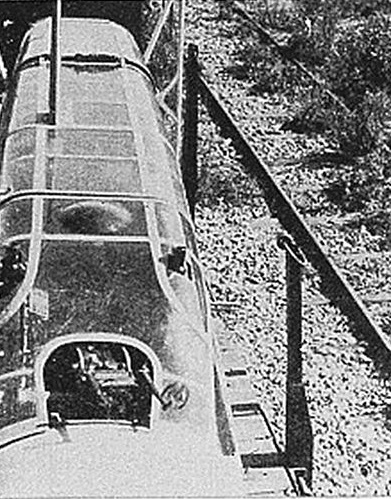
Rear view of a Bf 110G's rear cockpit glazing with MG FF/M Schräge Musik

Zorner maintained his success in 1944. Over Luckenwalde at 03:10 on 3 January 1944 Zorner accounted for his 21st victory. On 6 January at 02:42 and 02:51 he claimed two Lancasters northwest of Stettin and on 20 January at 19:31 and 19:45 he claimed one Halifax (LL135) and one Lancaster (JB419), while operating north west of Berlin. These victories were achieved with the Schräge Musik which had been installed on his Bf 110G-4 prior to the patrol. Four weeks later, on 15 February, Zorner filed claims for two Lancaster bombers at 20:22 and 21:11 near Berlin. The latest Lancaster bombers took his victory total to 27. On 20 February at 03:04 and 03:17 near Wesendorf, at 03:26 over Gardelegen, and at 03:41 south of Briest, Zorner claimed a Lancaster shot down to record his 28th–31st aerial victories.

On 24/25 February 1944, Bomber Command turned its attention to Schweinfurt. 554 Lancaster, 169 Halifax and 11 Mosquito bombers carried out the attack. The route took the bomber stream over Stuttgart. Bomber Command lost 26 Lancaster and seven Halifax bombers (4.5 per cent). Zorner claimed five bombers shot down, becoming an ace in one sortie. The first claim was made west of Stuttgart at 22:15, southwest of the city at 22:22, southwest at 22:30, west at 00:25 and finally north of Stuttgart at 00:51. All five were Lancasters. The latter two claims were made after midnight thus Zorner did not qualify for ace in a day status. By day-break Zorner had been officially credited with 35 enemy bombers destroyed in night operations.

On 1 March 1944 Zorner was promoted to Hauptmann (Captain). He continued to command 8. Staffel. He downed two Lancasters on 22 March in the Frankfurt area between 21:42 and 22:16. A solitary claim on 24 March was followed by a triple claim on 26 March. A single Lancaster was engaged and destroyed north of Oberhausen at 22:01, west of Sint Truiden at 23:03 and then southwest of Brussels at 23:12. For his achievements in battle Zorner was awarded the German Cross in Gold on 20 March 1944. On 4 April 1944 Zorner was appointed Gruppenkommandeur of III./Nachtjagdgeschwader 5 (NJG 5), based at Mainz Finthen Airport having relinquished his command of 8. Staffel the day before. In the early hours of 21 April 1944 Zorner claimed a rare victory for the German night fighter arm—a de Havilland Mosquito. Southeast of Antwerp at 03:00 Zorner spotted an aircraft which appeared to be a Junkers Ju 88 flying on one engine. Zorner closed to 50 metres (160 feet) and saw it was an enemy aircraft. He fired a burst that shattered the good engine. The British bomber dived into haze and four minutes later the crew observed an explosion on the ground. The following morning a Mosquito was confirmed shot down. The Mosquito belonged to No. 169 Squadron RAF. DD616, was operating out of RAF Little Snoring, Norfolk. Flight Lieutenant Morgan and his navigator Flight Sergeant Bentley bailed out.

=== Gruppenkommandeur ===
On the night of 27/28 April 1944, Bomber Command struck at Friedrichshafen with 322 heavy bombers. The diversion attacks confused German defences and no bomber was lost on the inward flight. The German night fighter reorganised and 18 were shot down on the homeward route. Zorner intercepted southeast of Nancy claimed it destroyed at 01:20. After 31 minutes Zorner's radar operator Heinrich Wilke gained another contact and Zorner duly shot down a second Lancaster southwest of Strasbourg. Northwest of Friedrichshafen, he shot down another bomber at 02:10. Zorner claimed a single victory on 1 June at 02:35 over Tergnier and the 3 June northwest of Evreux.

On 6 June 1944 Operation Overlord began. On that morning the D-Day landings began in Normandy. Within twenty-four hours Zorner's Gruppe had relocated to Athies-sous-Laon. The night fighter force resisted the Allied air forces over France by night and the skies over France became a target-rich environment. The RAF Second Tactical Air Force and the Ninth US Tactical Air Force flew night operations alongside bomber command. For the Luftwaffe, the night actions also produced dangers. Their bases were within easy range of No. 100 Group RAF night fighters.

Two days after his deployment to France, Zorner was awarded the Knight's Cross of the Iron Cross (Ritterkreuz des Eisernen Kreuzes) on 9 June for 48 victories. He received the award from Joseph Schmid, commanding 1. Jagdkorps. On the night of the 10/11 June 1944 he shot down four bombers targeting railway installations. The victories (nos. 49–52) were recorded west and southwest of Dreux with two more Lancaster bombers falling over Verneuil-sur-Avre between 01:00 and 01:42. The first three bombers were claimed within eight minutes. Zorner achieved a double victory on 25/26 June. Bomber Command sent 739 bombers including 53 Lancaster, 165 Halifax and 39 Mosquito bombers to attack the V-1 flying bomb sites in the Pas-de-Calais. At 00:30, east of Boulogne Zorner shot down a Lancaster with his front-firing guns and he used his Schärge Musik armament to down a second—his 54th victory.

On 1 July at 01:22 near Bourges Zorner shot down another Lancaster. On 24/25 July 1944 Bomber Command returned to the V-1 sites. Northwest of both Strasbourg and Saint-Dizier, between 02:35 and 02:54 Zorner claimed victory number 57 and 58. Zorner remained with NJG 5 but did not file another claim as the German front in Normandy collapsed. On 17 September 1944 Zorner became the 588th recipient of the Knight's Cross of the Iron Cross with Oak Leaves (Ritterkreuz des Eisernen Kreuzes mit Eichenlaub). It was not presented to Zorner until 2 December 1944 when he was handed the medal by Reichsmarshal Hermann Göring, commander-in-chief of the Luftwaffe at the Reichsluftfahrtministerium. By this time III./NJG 5 was based at Lübeck.

Zorner was transferred from front-line operations and on 13 October 1944 he appointed Gruppenkommandeur of II./Nachtjagdgeschwader 100 equipped with Ju 88G night-fighters based at Nový Dvůr. On 1 December 1944 Zorner was promoted to major. He commanded the unit in operations over Czechoslovakia and Austria until 8 May 1945. The promotion came six days after his radar operator Feldwebel Heinrich Wilke, was awarded the Knight's Cross on 25 November 1944 for participating in all Zorner's 58 victories. II./NJG 100 was subordinated to the 7th Jagddivision (7th Fighter Division).

The Geschwader relocated several times owing to Red Army advances, moving to Vienna, Linz, Prague and finally to Karlsbad in western Germany. The Gruppe was overloaded with 53 of the Ju 88G-6 models and Zorner had 630 men under his command. Only 35 were technically fit for operations and he classified only four as combat ready. On the evening of 5/6 March 1945, the group was ordered to scramble a single Ju 88. Zorner decided to fly himself, after a long period of non-operational flying. South southwest of Graz, he shot down Consolidated B-24 Liberator at 01:30.

One B-24 was lost on this night to a night fighter. Liberator VI KH150, "R", of 34 Squadron SAAF was shot down and the crew were killed. Lieutenant J. B. Masson, C. E. Park, Second Lieutenant C. D. Foord, Flying Officer F. S. A. Thomas, A. R. Thomas, M. A. Ueckermann, R. V. Wilkson and Sergeant A. Stables died. They are buried in Udine, Italy.

== Later life ==
Zorner surrendered his Gruppe to United States Army forces near Karlovy Vary on 8 May 1945. Only Zorner and an interpreter were allowed through the lines. Zorner refused to abandon his men and for a week he remained with them under American guard. He was then handed over to Soviet forces on 17 May. The men were marched without food for 190 kilometres (120 mi) to Hoyerswerda north east of Dresden. Zorner was separated from his men and confined with 2,000 other officers. They survived on rations of fish soup and bread. In October 1945 he was transported to the Caucasus Mountains, in southern Russia. Some 500 officers were sent to a camp at Tkibuli, near Kutaisi, in the Georgian region of the Soviet Union. The prisoners organised the camp themselves. They were permitted to travel within a 64 kilometres (40 mi) radius around the camp as long as their work assignments were complete. The German prisoners received some form of monetary payment.

Highly decorated officers were responsible for the kitchen and keeping the peace in the camp. The rooms were four by three metres in area. On the longer wall a wooden framework was mounted. Across this layered boards which measured two metres in length were stacked with a varying gap of 0.5–1.8 m (1 ft 8 in – 5 ft 11 in). Outside was a corridor that was a metre wide. In 18 of the 20 rooms 500 prisoners were housed, usually 22 per room. The prisoners had to travel some 5–6 kilometres (3.1–3.7 mi) on foot every morning to a quarry where they worked for eight hours drilling out limestone and fed 600 grams of bread and half a litre of cabbage soup. Zoner worked in the camp until the end of 1946.

In January 1946 Zorner was moved to a harsher environment in a coal mine. He heard a rumour that officers of major rank and above could not be forced to work. He refused to work anymore and was subjected to punishment by the NKVD. The following day he was locked in solitary confinement. The following morning Zorner explained that he would prefer to work as a carpenter and the NKVD officers agreed. From April 1946 the conditions slowly improved in the camp. Ill-treatment from the guards, which had been rare anyway, stopped altogether. At the end of 1947 the prisoners were allowed to send letters to Germany. In 1948 they were permitted to receive packages from their families. In March 1949, Zorner and others planned to escape to Turkey, but events overtook them and the prisoners were repatriated to Germany.

On 19 December 1949 the prisoners were deloused, given new clothes, and transported to Brest-Litovsk on 23 December. From there he was sent to Frankfurt, where he arrived on 29 December. On 1 January 1950 he was sent to Ulm and was processed on 2 January. Zorner then travelled to Kaiserslautern in the French zone of occupation to obtain his discharge certificate and was officially a civilian on 3 January 1950.

Zorner studied mechanical engineering in Stuttgart and entered the field of refrigeration engineering before he rejoined the West German Air Force (Luftwaffe) in 1956. He was not passed fit to fly jet fighters and returned to civilian life in May 1957. He was employed within the chemical industry. He retired in 1981 as a chief engineer with Hoechst near Frankfurt. In May 2006, Zorner received the Order of Merit of the Federal Republic of Germany (Verdienstorden der Bundesrepublik Deutschland) for his voluntary services as founder of the "Silesian Partnership" (Partnerschaft mit Schlesien). The association, which was founded in 1995, aims to improve German-Polish relations and, among other things, has organised help during the 1997 Central European flood. Zorner died on 27 January 2014 in Homburg.

== Summary of career ==
=== Aerial victory claims ===
According to US historian David T. Zabecki, Zorner was credited with 58 aerial victories. Obermaier also lists him with 59 nocturnal aerial victories, claimed in 272 combat missions, 110 of which as a night fighter.

Chronicle of aerial victories
Claim	Date	Time	Type	Location	Serial No./Squadron No.
– 2. Staffel of Nachtjagdgeschwader 3 –
1	17 January 1943	21:55	Halifax	45 km (28 mi) northwest Juist	
2	11 February 1943	20:44	Lancaster	40 km (25 mi) west-northwest Borkum	
3	19 February 1943	20:34	Boston	north Norderney	
4	26 February 1943	20:46	Stirling	30 km (19 mi) north-northwest Schiermonnikoog	
5	7 March 1943	20:30	Wellington	northeast Norden	
6	14 March 1943	03:51	Wellington	3 km (1.9 mi) north Nordeney	Wellington BK296/No. 420 Squadron RCAF
– 1. Staffel of Nachtjagdgeschwader 3 –
7	29 June 1943	02:20	Wellington	southeast Antwerp	
8	29 June 1943	02:22	Wellington	9 km (5.6 mi) northeast Leuven	
9	4 July 1943	01:09	Wellington	southwest Sint-Truiden	
10	9 July 1943	01:53	Lancaster	west Malmedy	
11	25 July 1943	03:54	Halifax	11 km (6.8 mi) northeast Gröningen	R5573/No. 106 Squadron RAF
– 7. Staffel of Nachtjagdgeschwader 3 –
12	18 August 1943	01:53	Lancaster	Baltic Sea	
13	18 August 1943	02:03	Lancaster	Peenemünde	
– 8. Staffel of Nachtjagdgeschwader 3 –
14	23 November 1943	20:09	four-engined bomber	40 km (25 mi) northwest Berlin	
15	2 December 1943	19:24	Lancaster	near Diepholz	
16	2 December 1943	20:29	Lancaster	southwest Berlin	
17	20 December 1943	20:02	Lancaster	Hintermeiligen	
18	24 December 1943	03:02	Lancaster	east Giessen	
19	24 December 1943	05:43	Lancaster	south Diepholz	
20	24 December 1943	06:02	Lancaster	Cloppenburg	
21	3 January 1944	03:10	Lancaster	near Luckenwalde	
22	6 January 1944	03:42	Lancaster	northwest Stettin	
23	6 January 1944	03:51	Lancaster	northwest Stettin	
24	20 January 1944	19:31	Halifax	north Berlin	
25	20 January 1944	19:45	Lancaster	north Berlin	
26	15 February 1944	20:22	Lancaster	3 km (1.9 mi) southeast Ribnitz	ME636/No. 166 Squadron
27	15 February 1944	21:11	Lancaster	northwest Berlin	
28	20 February 1944	03:04	Lancaster	Wesendorf	
29	20 February 1944	03:17	Lancaster	near Wesendorf	Halifax LK905/No. 431 (Iroquois) Squadron RCAF (Note: According to the Aviation Safety Network, potentially claimed by Oberleutnant Josef Kraft.)
30	20 February 1944	03:26	Lancaster	Gardelegen	
31	20 February 1944	03:41	Lancaster	south Briest	
– Stab III. Gruppe of Nachtjagdgeschwader 3 –
32	24 February 1944	22:15	Lancaster	southwest Stuttgart	
33	24 February 1944	22:22	Lancaster	west-southwest Stuttgart	
34	24 February 1944	22:30	Lancaster	southwest Stuttgart	
35	25 February 1944	00:25	Lancaster	west Stuttgart	
36	25 February 1944	0:51	Lancaster	north Stuttgart	
– 8. Staffel of Nachtjagdgeschwader 3 –
37	22 March 1944	21:43	Lancaster	near Giessen	
38	22 March 1944	22:18	four-engined bomber	near Giessen	
39	24 March 1944	22:57	four-engined bomber	east Leipzig	
40	26 March 1944	22:30	four-engined bomber	French border	
41	26 March 1944	23:04	four-engined bomber	west Sint-Truiden	
– Stab III. Gruppe of Nachtjagdgeschwader 5 –
42	21 April 1944	03:30	Mosquito	20 km (12 mi) southeast Brussels	
43	23 April 1944	01:03	Halifax	near Aachen	Lancaster ME581/No. 550 Squadron RAF
44	28 April 1944	01:20	Lancaster	southeast Nancy	
45	28 April 1944	01:51	Lancaster	southwest Strasbourg	
46	28 April 1944	02:10	Lancaster	northwest Friedrichshafen	
47	1 June 1944	02:35	Lancaster	30 km (19 mi) west-northwest Tergnier	
48	3 June 1944	01:22	Lancaster	30 km (19 mi) west-northwest Évreux	
49	11 June 1944	01:00	Halifax	west Dreux	
50	11 June 1944	01:01	Halifax	Verneuil-sur-Avre	
51	11 June 1944	01:08	Halifax	Verneuil-sur-Avre	
52	11 June 1944	01:42	Lancaster	10 km (6.2 mi) southwest Dreux	
53	25 June 1944	00:32	Lancaster	east Boulogne-sur-Mer	
54	25 June 1944	00:50	Lancaster	northwest Étaples	
55	1 July 1944	01:22	Lancaster	15 km (9.3 mi) southwest Bourges	
56	25 July 1944	02:25	Lancaster	west Strasbourg	
57	25 July 1944	02:35	Lancaster	northwest Strasbourg	
58	25 July 1944	2:54	Lancaster	30 km (19 mi) northwest Saint-Dizier	
– Stab II. Gruppe of Nachtjagdgeschwader 100 –
59	6 March 1945	01:30	B-24	south-southeast Graz	B-24 KH150/34 Squadron SAAF

=== Awards ===
- Iron Cross (1939)
  - 2nd Class (9 June 1941)
  - 1st Class (12 March 1943)
- Honour Goblet of the Luftwaffe (Ehrenpokal der Luftwaffe) on 20 September 1943 as Oberleutnant and Staffelkapitän (Note: According to Obermaier and Williams on 31 August 1943.)
- Front Flying Clasp of the Luftwaffe
  - in Bronze for Transport Pilots on 21 August 1941
  - in Silver for Transport Pilots on 22 October 1941
  - in Gold for Night Fighter Pilots on 30 March 1944
- German Cross in Gold on 20 March 1944 as Oberleutnant in the 8./Nachtjagdgeschwader 3
- Knight's Cross of the Iron Cross with Oak Leaves
  - Knight's Cross on 9 June 1944 as Hauptmann and Staffelkapitän of the 8./Nachtjagdgeschwader 3
  - 588th Oak Leaves on 17 September 1944 as Hauptmann and Gruppenkommandeur of the III./Nachtjagdgeschwader 5
- Medal of Merit of the Order of Merit of the Federal Republic of Germany (2006)
