= Annopol, Wołomin County =

Annopol
- Village
- Location within Poland
- Coordinates: 52°26′N 21°42′E
- Country: Poland
- Voivodeship: Masovian
- County: Wołomin
- Gmina: Strachówka
- Time zone: UTC+1 (CET)
  - Summer (DST): UTC+2 (CEST)

Annopol [anˈnɔpɔl] is a village in the administrative district of Gmina Strachówka, within Wołomin County, Masovian Voivodeship, in east-central Poland.

Six Polish citizens were murdered by Nazi Germany in the village during World War II.
