= Zawiszyn, Masovian Voivodeship =

Zawiszyn Zawiszyn
- Village
- Zawiszyn
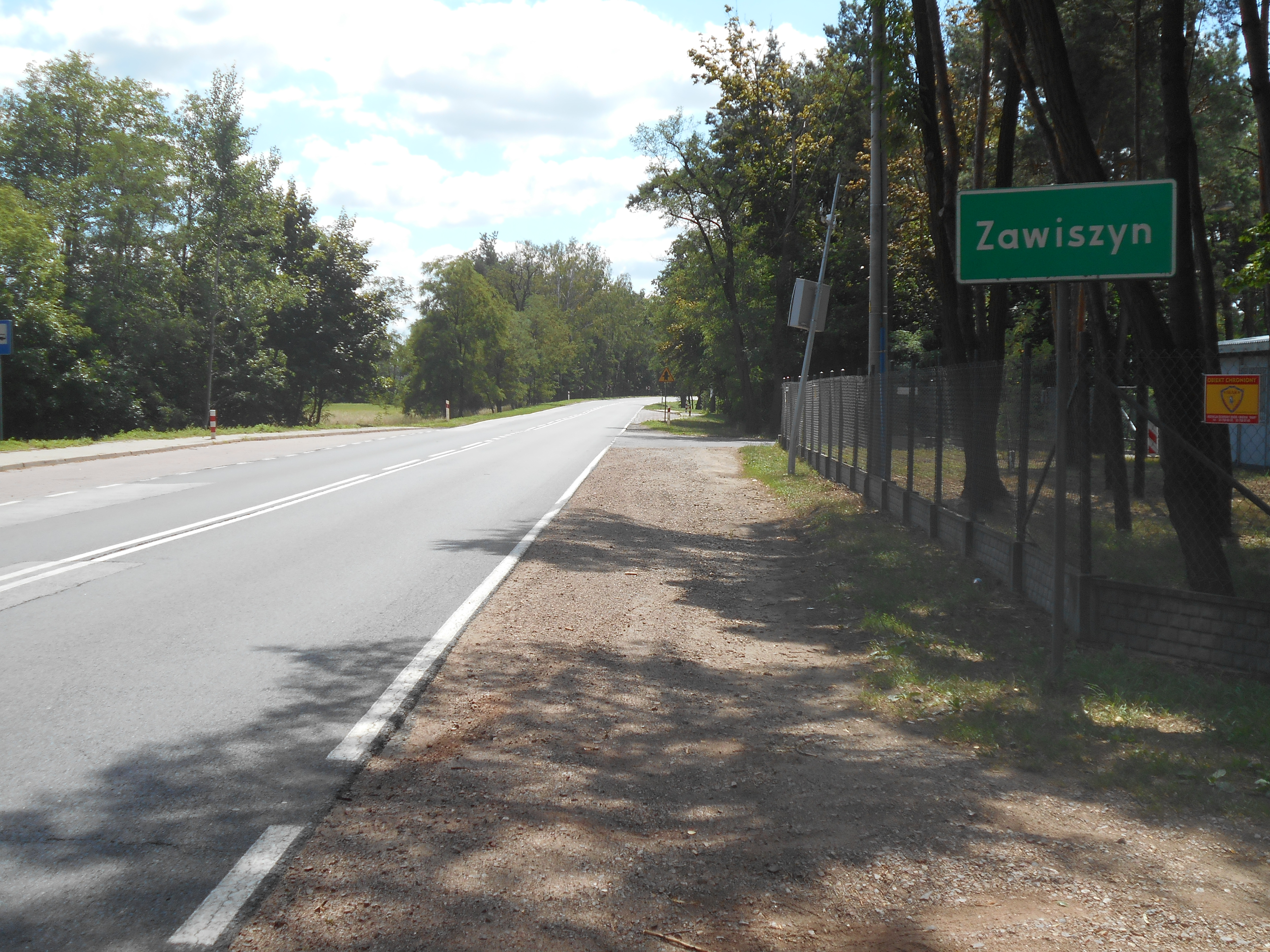

- Location within Poland
- Coordinates: 52°30′N 21°41′E
- Country: Poland
- Voivodeship: Masovian
- County: Wołomin
- Gmina: Jadów
- Population: 523

Zawiszyn [zaˈviʂɨn] is a village in the administrative district of Gmina Jadów, within Wołomin County, Masovian Voivodeship, in east-central Poland.
