= Iły, Masovian Voivodeship =

Iły
- Village
- Location within Poland
- Coordinates: 52°31′50″N 21°36′13″E
- Country: Poland
- Voivodeship: Masovian
- County: Wołomin
- Gmina: Jadów
- Population: 77

Iły [ˈiwɨ] is a village in the administrative district of Gmina Jadów, within Wołomin County, Masovian Voivodeship, in east-central Poland.
