= Wiktoria, Masovian Voivodeship =

Wiktoria
- Village
- Location within Poland
- Coordinates: 52°23′N 21°42′E
- Country: Poland
- Voivodeship: Masovian
- County: Wołomin
- Gmina: Strachówka

Wiktoria [vikˈtɔrja] is a village in the administrative district of Gmina Strachówka, within Wołomin County, Masovian Voivodeship, in east-central Poland.
