= Sitne =

- Village
- Location within Poland
- Coordinates: 52°29′N 21°32′E
- Country: Poland
- Voivodeship: Masovian
- County: Wołomin
- Gmina: Jadów

Sitne [ˈɕitnɛ] is a village in the administrative district of Gmina Jadów, within Wołomin County, Masovian Voivodeship, in east-central Poland.
