= Strachów, Masovian Voivodeship =

Strachów
- Village
- Location within Poland
- Coordinates: 52°32′N 21°36′E
- Country: Poland
- Voivodeship: Masovian
- County: Wołomin
- Gmina: Jadów
- Population: 160

Strachów [ˈstraxuf] is a village in the administrative district of Gmina Jadów, within Wołomin County, Masovian Voivodeship, in east-central Poland.
