= Kąty-Miąski =

- Village
- Location within Poland
- Coordinates: 52°21′43″N 21°35′33″E
- Country: Poland
- Voivodeship: Masovian
- County: Wołomin
- Gmina: Strachówka

Kąty-Miąski [ˈkɔntɨ ˈmjɔ̃ski] is a village in the administrative district of Gmina Strachówka, within Wołomin County, Masovian Voivodeship, in east-central Poland.
