= Zofinin =

- Village
- Location within Poland
- Coordinates: 52°25′N 21°39′E
- Country: Poland
- Voivodeship: Masovian
- County: Wołomin
- Gmina: Strachówka

Zofinin [zɔˈfinin] is a village in the administrative district of Gmina Strachówka, within Wołomin County, Masovian Voivodeship, in east-central Poland.
