= Adampol, Wołomin County =

Adampol
- Village
- Location within Poland
- Coordinates: 52°31′1″N 21°35′24″E
- Country: Poland
- Voivodeship: Masovian
- County: Wołomin
- Gmina: Jadów

Adampol [aˈdampɔl] is a village in the administrative district of Gmina Jadów, within Wołomin County, Masovian Voivodeship, in east-central Poland.
