= Gmina Jadów =

Gmina Jadów Jadów Commune
- Gmina
- Coat of arms

- Location within Poland
- Coordinates (Jadów): 52°28′N 21°38′E
- Country: Poland
- Voivodeship: Masovian
- County: Wołomin
- Seat: Jadów

Area
  - Total: 116.87 km^{2} (45.12 sq mi)

Population (2016)
  - Total: 7,602
  - Density: 65.05/km^{2} (168.5/sq mi)
- Website: http://www.jadow.az.pl/

Gmina Jadów is a rural gmina (administrative district) in Wołomin County, Masovian Voivodeship, in east-central Poland. Its seat is the village of Jadów, which lies approximately 30 kilometres (19 mi) north-east of Wołomin and 50 km (31 mi) north-east of Warsaw.

The gmina covers an area of 116.87 square kilometres (45.1 sq mi), and as of 2006 its total population is 7,715 (7,708 in 2013).

== Villages ==
Gmina Jadów contains the villages and settlements of Adampol, Borki, Borzymy, Dębe Małe, Dębe Wielkie, Dzierżanów, Iły, Jadów, Kukawki, Myszadła, Nowinki, Nowy Jadów, Nowy Jadów-Letnisko, Oble, Podbale, Podmyszadła, Sitne, Starowola, Strachów, Sulejów, Szewnica, Urle, Warmiaki, Wójty, Wólka Sulejowska, Wujówka, Wyglądały and Zawiszyn.

== Neighbouring gminas ==
Gmina Jadów is bordered by the gminas of Korytnica, Łochów, Strachówka, Tłuszcz, Wyszków and Zabrodzie.
