= Kukawki, Wołomin County =

Kukawki
- Village
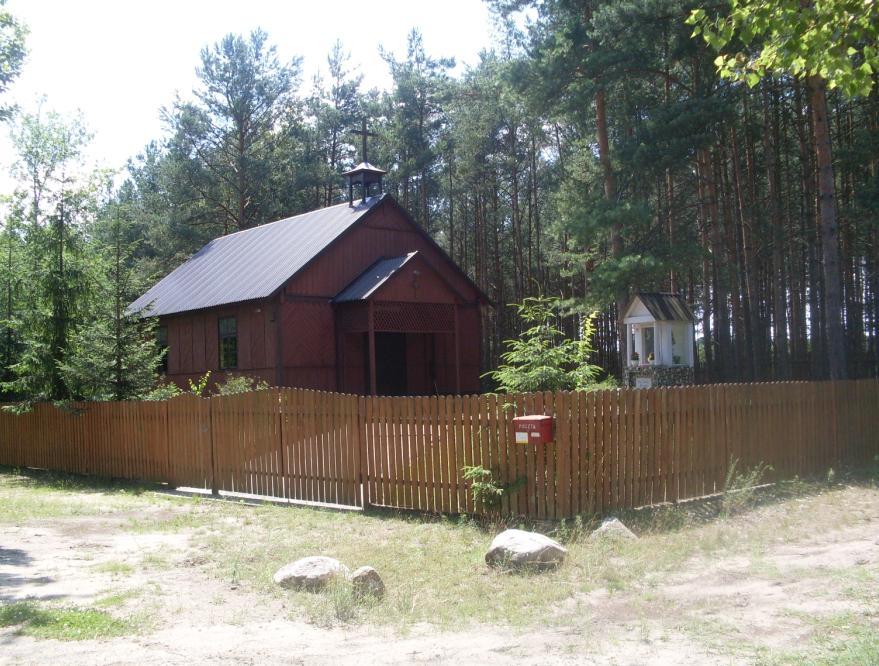

- Location within Poland
- Coordinates: 52°32′N 21°34′E
- Country: Poland
- Voivodeship: Masovian
- County: Wołomin
- Gmina: Jadów

Kukawki [kuˈkafki] is a village in the administrative district of Gmina Jadów, within Wołomin County, Masovian Voivodeship, in east-central Poland.
