= Kąty-Wielgi =

- Village
- Location within Poland
- Coordinates: 52°22′56″N 21°33′00″E
- Country: Poland
- Voivodeship: Masovian
- County: Wołomin
- Gmina: Strachówka

Kąty-Wielgi [ˈkɔntɨ ˈvjɛlɡi] is a village in the administrative district of Gmina Strachówka, within Wołomin County, Masovian Voivodeship, in east-central Poland.
