= Piaski, Wołomin County =

Piaski
- Village
- Location within Poland
- Coordinates: 52°27′N 21°36′E
- Country: Poland
- Voivodeship: Masovian
- County: Wołomin
- Gmina: Strachówka

Piaski (Polish pronunciation: [ˈpjaskʲi]) is a village in the administrative district of Gmina Strachówka, within Wołomin County, Masovian Voivodeship, in east-central Poland.
