= Borki, Gmina Jadów =

Borki
- Village
- Location within Poland
- Coordinates: 52°27′51″N 21°38′43″E
- Country: Poland
- Voivodeship: Masovian
- County: Wołomin
- Gmina: Jadów

Borki [ˈbɔrki] is a village in the administrative district of Gmina Jadów, within Wołomin County, Masovian Voivodeship, in east-central Poland.
