= Wólka Sulejowska =

- Village
- Location within Poland
- Coordinates: 52°27′N 21°32′E
- Country: Poland
- Voivodeship: Masovian
- County: Wołomin
- Gmina: Jadów
- Website: http://ospws.w.interia.pl

Wólka Sulejowska [ˈvulka sulɛˈjɔfska] is a village in the administrative district of Gmina Jadów, within Wołomin County, Masovian Voivodeship, in east-central Poland.
