= Nowy Jadów =

- Village
- Location within Poland
- Coordinates: 52°29′26″N 21°37′25″E
- Country: Poland
- Voivodeship: Masovian
- County: Wołomin
- Gmina: Jadów
- Population: 440

Nowy Jadów [ˈnɔvɨ ˈjaduf] is a village in the administrative district of Gmina Jadów, within Wołomin County, Masovian Voivodeship, in east-central Poland.
