= Warmiaki =

- Village
- Location within Poland
- Coordinates: 52°27′48″N 21°39′26″E
- Country: Poland
- Voivodeship: Masovian
- County: Wołomin
- Gmina: Jadów
- Population: 70

Warmiaki [varˈmjaki] is a village in the administrative district of Gmina Jadów, within Wołomin County, Masovian Voivodeship, in east-central Poland.
