= Strachówka =

- Village
- Location within Poland
- Coordinates: 52°26′N 21°39′E
- Country: Poland
- Voivodeship: Masovian
- County: Wołomin
- Gmina: Strachówka
- Population: 390

Strachówka [straˈxufka] is a village in Wołomin County, Masovian Voivodeship, in east-central Poland. It is the seat of the gmina (administrative district) called Gmina Strachówka.
