= Nowy Jadów-Letnisko =

Letnisko Nowy Jadów
- Village
- Location within Poland
- Coordinates: 52°30′07″N 21°37′34″E
- Country: Poland
- Voivodeship: Masovian
- County: Wołomin
- Gmina: Jadów

Letnisko Nowy Jadów [ˈlɛtˈnisko-nɔvɨ ˈjaduf] is a village in the administrative district of Gmina Jadów, within Wołomin County, Masovian Voivodeship, in east-central Poland.
