= Ruda-Czernik =

- Village
- Location within Poland
- Coordinates: 52°23′32″N 21°39′33″E
- Country: Poland
- Voivodeship: Masovian
- County: Wołomin
- Gmina: Strachówka

Ruda-Czernik [ˈruda ˈt͡ʂɛrnik] is a village in the administrative district of Gmina Strachówka, within Wołomin County, Masovian Voivodeship, in east-central Poland.
