= Szlędaki =

- Village
- Location within Poland
- Coordinates: 52°22′N 21°31′E
- Country: Poland
- Voivodeship: Masovian
- County: Wołomin
- Gmina: Strachówka

Szlędaki [ʂlɛnˈdaki] is a village in the administrative district of Gmina Strachówka, within Wołomin County, Masovian Voivodeship, in east-central Poland.
