= Równe, Masovian Voivodeship =

Równe
- Village
- Location within Poland
- Coordinates: 52°25′N 21°36′E
- Country: Poland
- Voivodeship: Masovian
- County: Wołomin
- Gmina: Strachówka
- Time zone: UTC+1 (CET)
  - Summer (DST): UTC+2 (CEST)
- Postal code: 05-282
- Vehicle registration: WWL

Równe [ˈruvnɛ] is a village in the administrative district of Gmina Strachówka, within Wołomin County, Masovian Voivodeship, in east-central Poland.

In 1827, the village had a population of 291.
