= Równe, Opole Voivodeship =

Równe
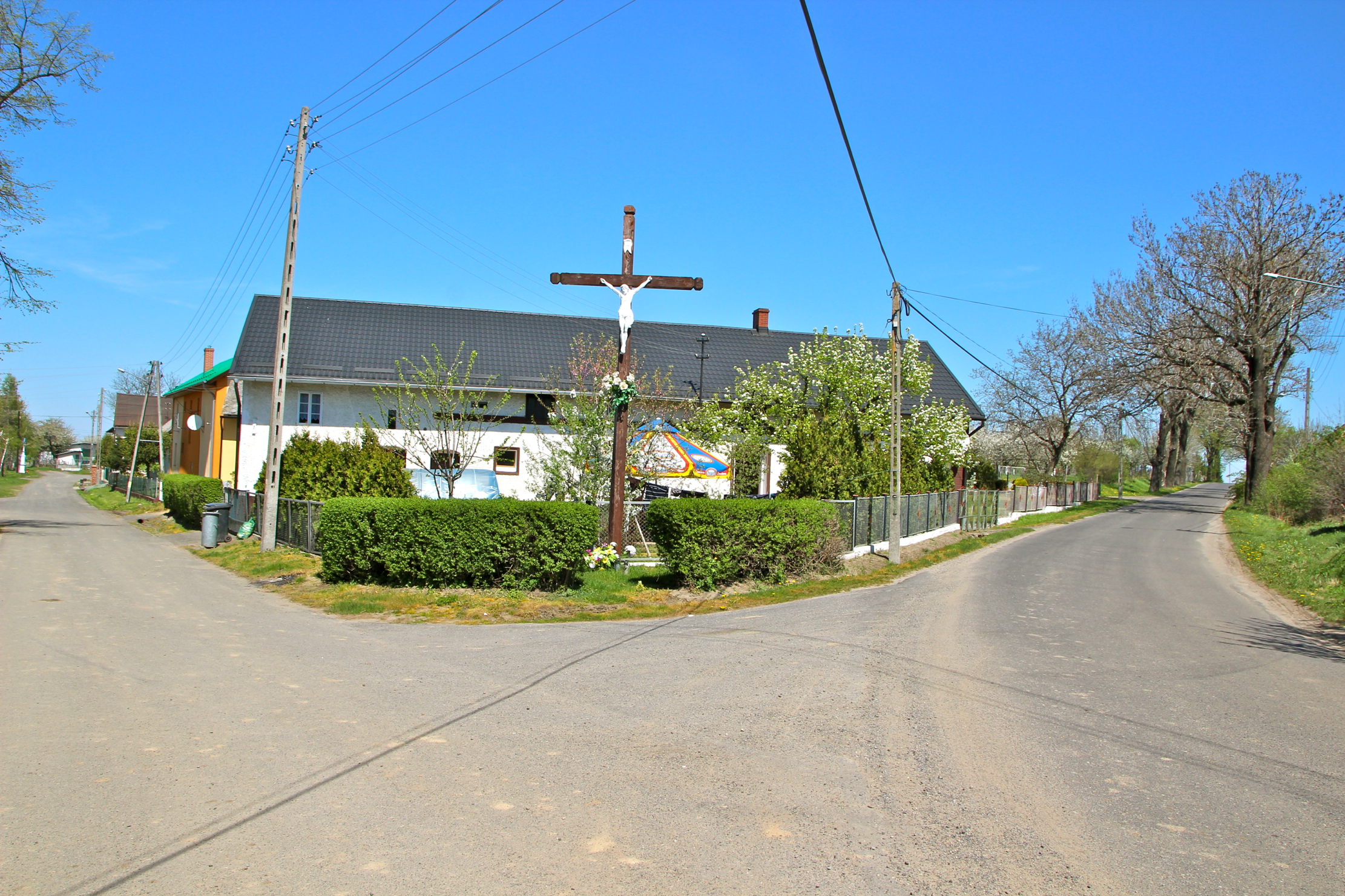

- Location within Poland
- Coordinates: 50°11′28″N 17°43′41″E
- Country: Poland
- Voivodeship: Opole
- County: Głubczyce
- Gmina: Głubczyce
- Time zone: UTC+1 (CET)
  - Summer (DST): UTC+2 (CEST)
- Postal code: 48-151
- Area code: +48 77
- Car plates: OGL

Równe [ˈruvnɛ] is a village located in Poland, in Opole Voivodeship, Głubczyce County, Gmina Głubczyce, near the border with the Czech Republic.

== Notable residents ==
- Paul Zorner (1920–2014), Luftwaffe pilot
