= Urle =

- Village
- Location within Poland
- Coordinates: 52°31′N 21°37′E
- Country: Poland
- Voivodeship: Masovian
- County: Wołomin
- Gmina: Jadów
- Population: 461

Urle [ˈurlɛ] is a village in the administrative district of Gmina Jadów, within Wołomin County, Masovian Voivodeship, in east-central Poland.

According to a local custom, neighbouring villages, especially Nowy Jadów-Letnisko and Borzymy-Letnisko, are also called by the same name; together these create an almost seamless complex that spreads on both sides of the two-track Warsaw-Białystok railway line (former Warsaw – Saint Petersburg Railway). The villages are served by a railway stop named after Urle; the stop is used only by local trains of Masovian Railways (previously PKP) that travel between Warsaw and Małkinia Górna (or closer Łochów on the same line).

Urle lie on the western bank of small and shallow Liwiec river and are surrounded by pine forests. Its name is thought to have come from a word "orle" associated with wet areas. Thanks to unusual microclimate Urle have been a popular tourist and vacation destination for people living in Warsaw. Many wooden rent houses have been built there in the pre-World War II era; the role of a summer destination (reflected in the name "letnisko" of many of its satellite spots) continued throughout the times of Communism when several big camping centers were built. Individual people also kept on visiting the villages, renting flats in old rent houses or simply in peasant huts; this form of vacation was nicknamed "wczasy pod gruszą" (literally, "holidays under a pear tree"). In the tourist season, professional (though unofficial) "agents" waited for potential customers at the station. The popularity of Urle diminished after 1989; some camping centers, previously run by now troubled companies, were liquidated.

== Gallery ==
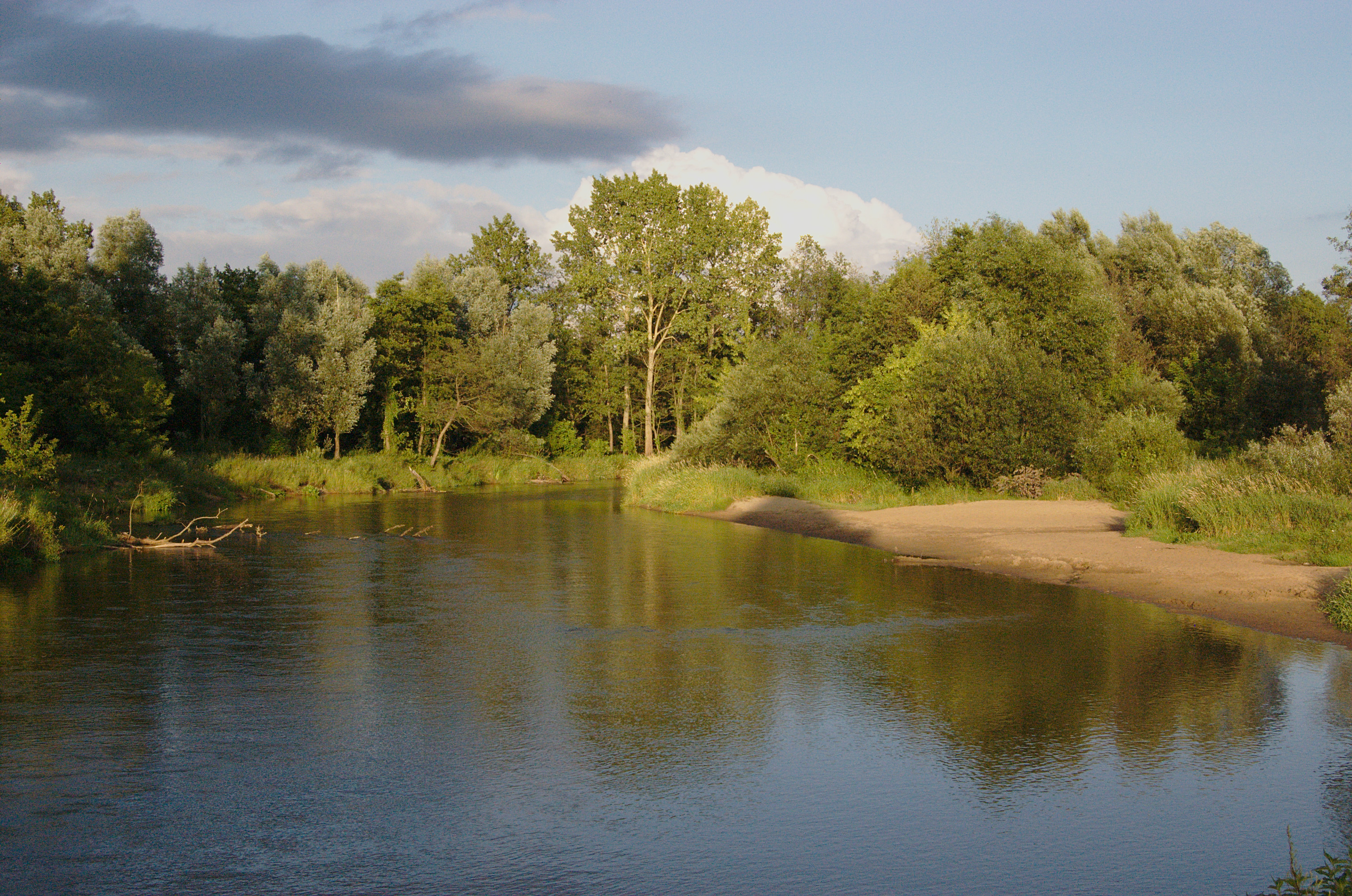
Liwiec river in Urle

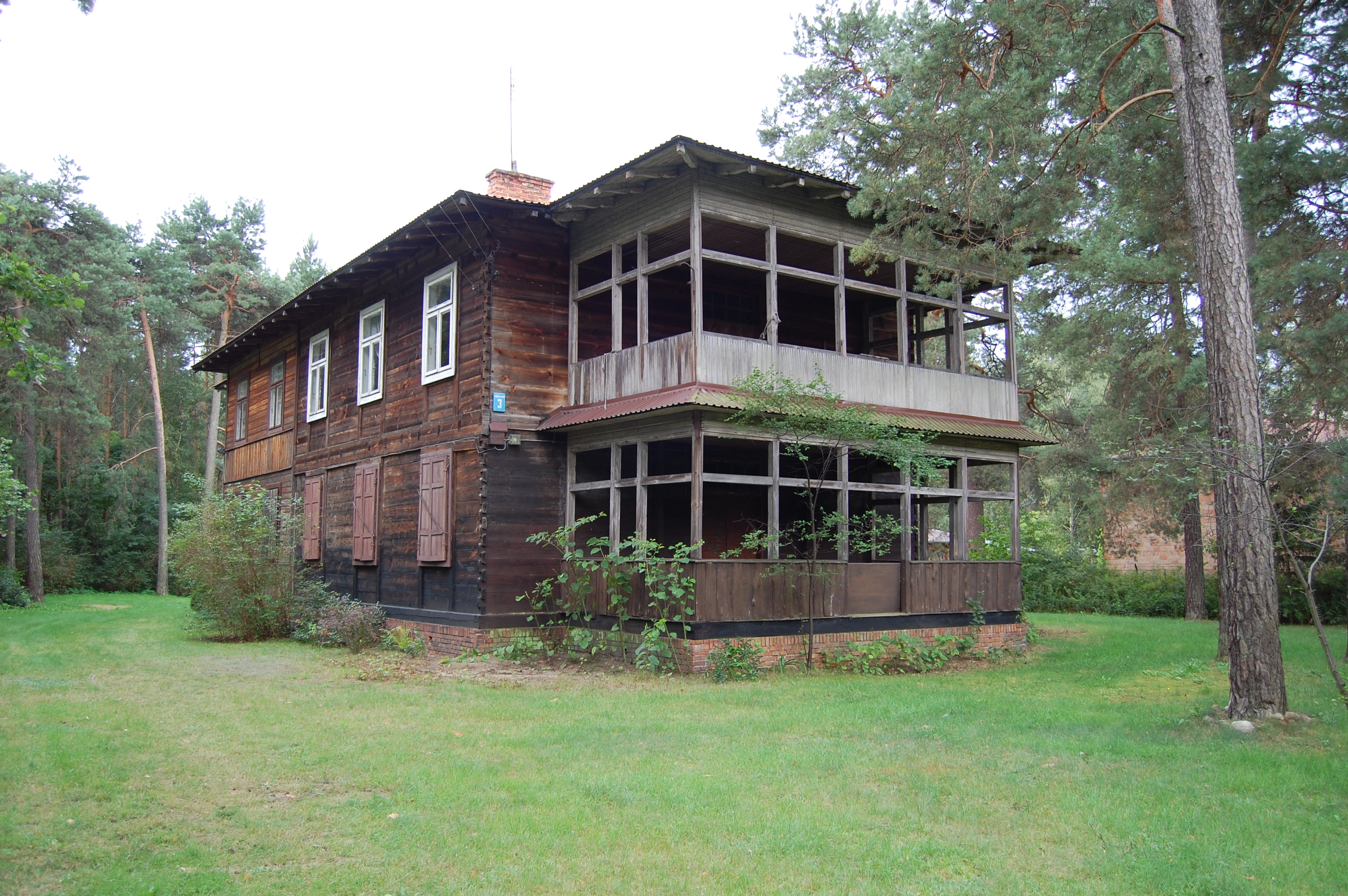
Wooden house from the period of summer resort

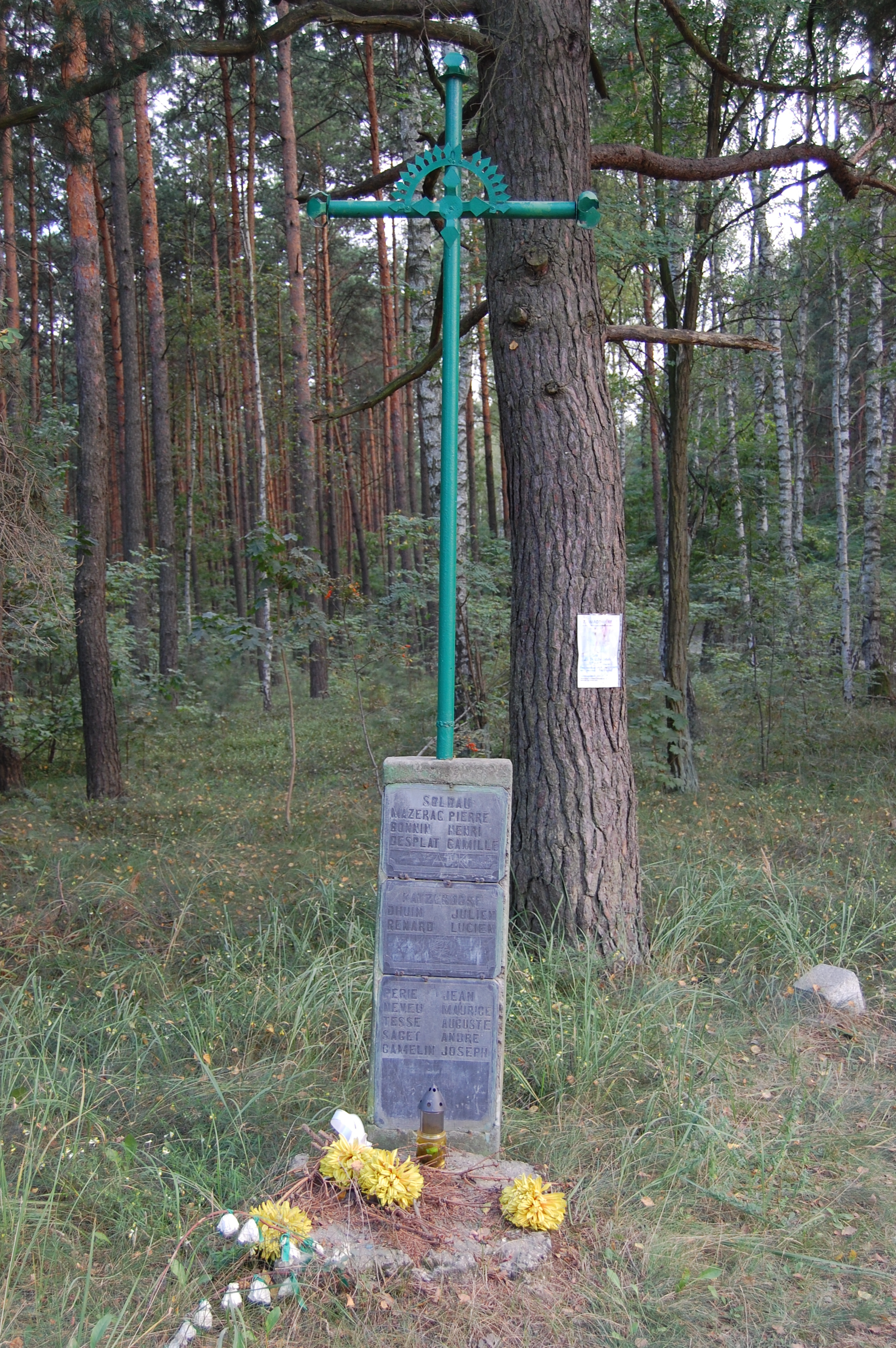
Frenchmen's grave

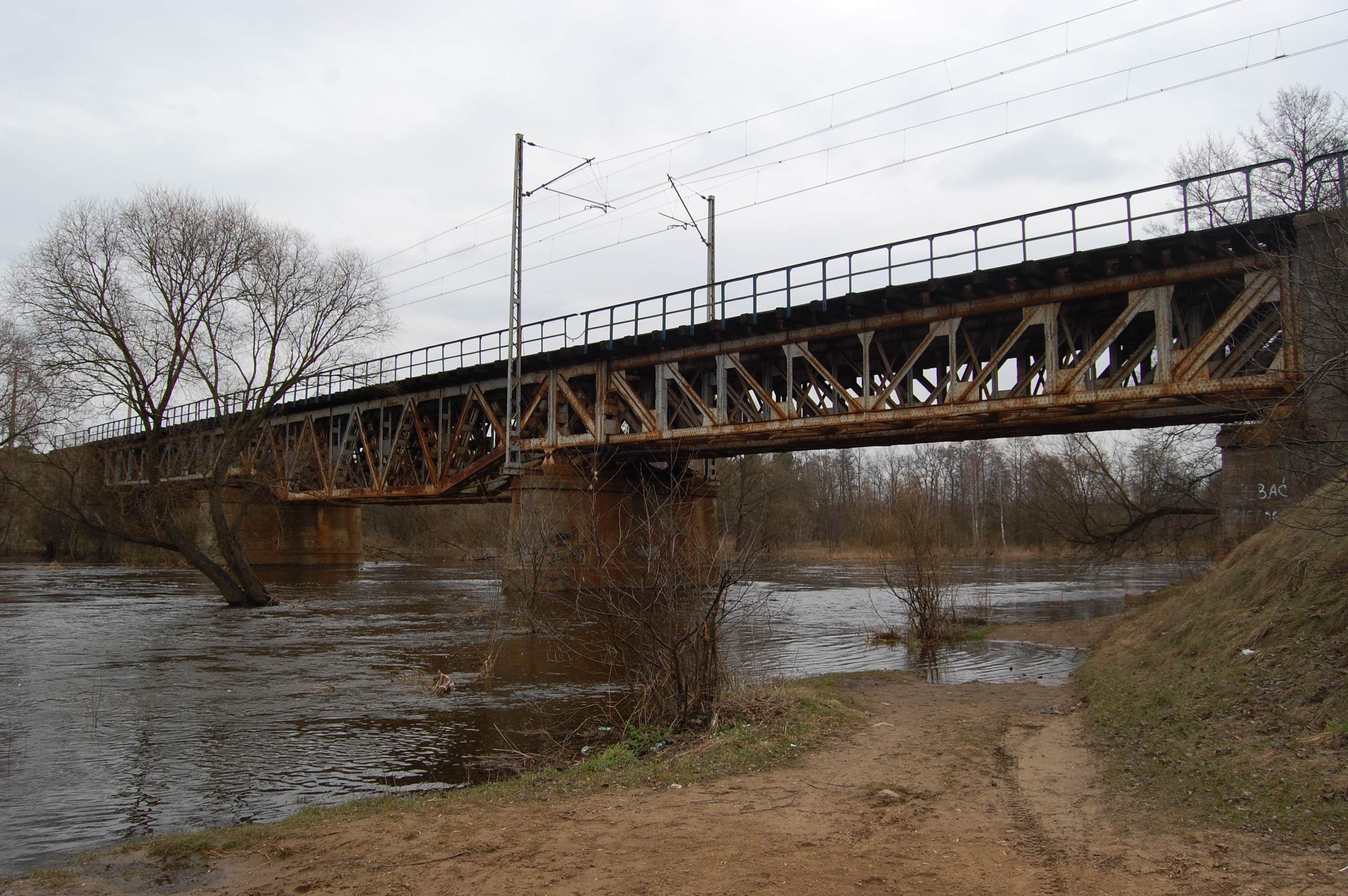
Non-existing railway bridge on Liwiec

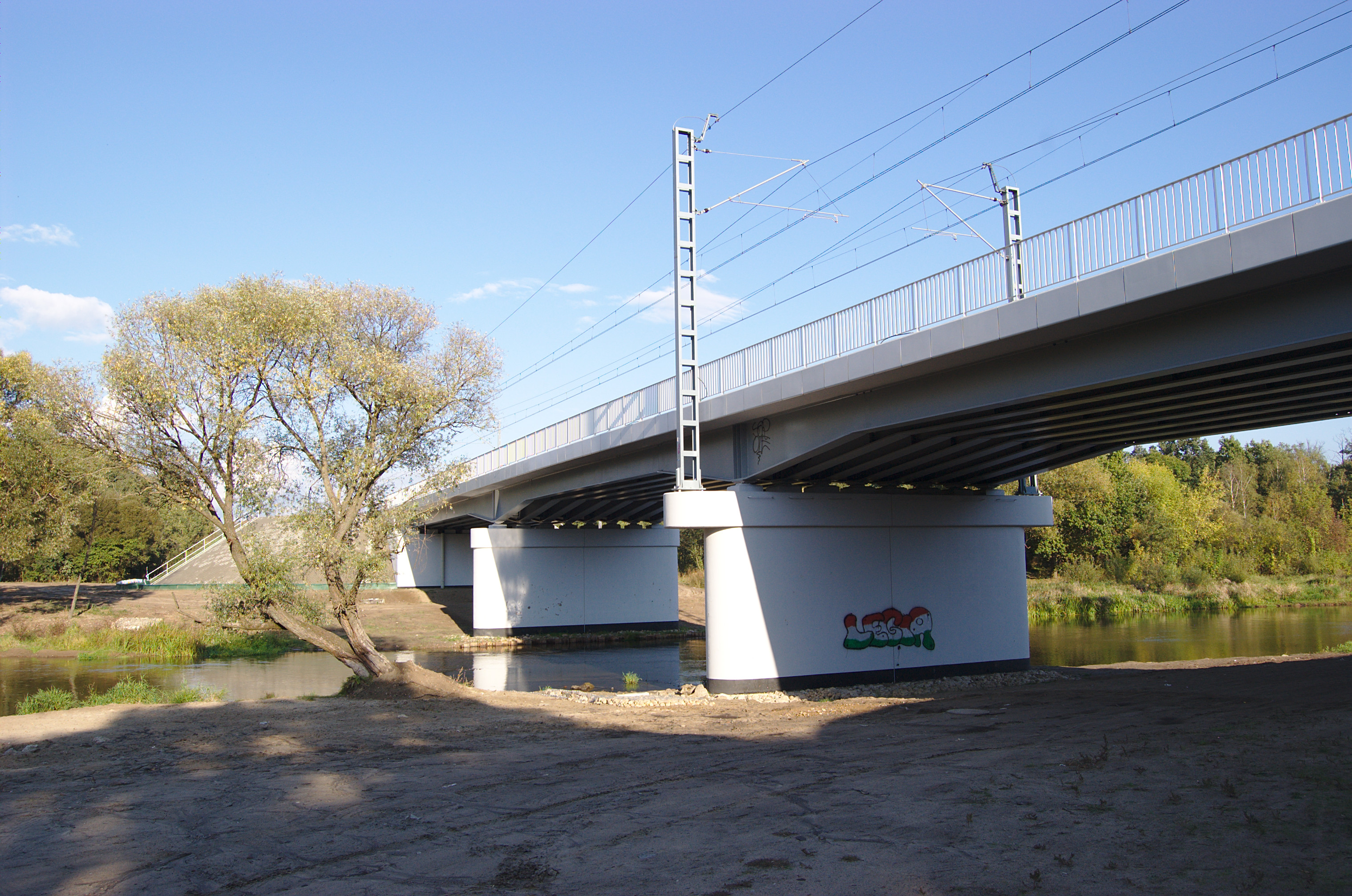
New railway bridge on Liwiec
