= Krawcowizna =

- Village
- Location within Poland
- Coordinates: 52°25′N 21°35′E
- Country: Poland
- Voivodeship: Masovian
- County: Wołomin
- Gmina: Strachówka

Krawcowizna [kraft͡sɔˈvizna] is a village in the administrative district of Gmina Strachówka, within Wołomin County, Masovian Voivodeship, in east-central Poland. From 1975 to 1998, Krawcowizna was part of Siedlce Voivodeship.
