= Radzymin (Hasidic Dynasty) =

Polish Hasidic dynasty

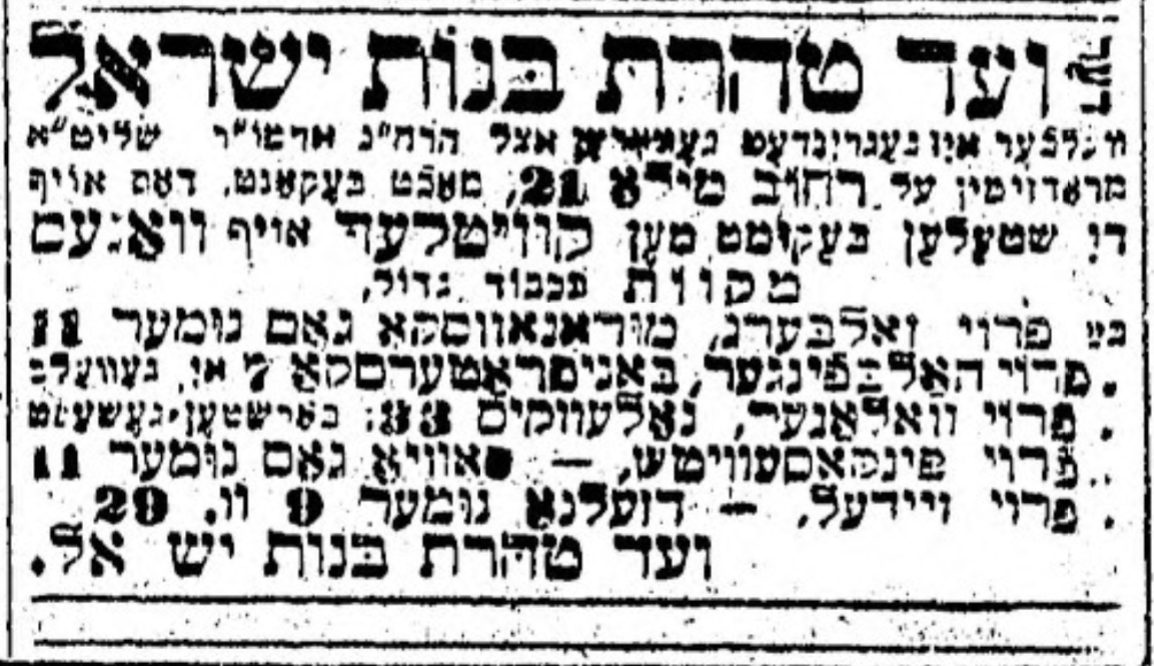
Newspaper notice of an event with the Radzyminer rebbe, 1921

Radzymin was a Polish Chasidic dynasty named after its founder Yaakov Aryeh Guterman's hometown of Radzymin.

== History ==
Jews had first started settling in Radzymin in the middle of the seventeenth-century. By 1840 the community erected their first synagogue. In 1848, after the death of Rabbi Yitzchok of Vurka, Rabbi Yaakov Guterman founded the Radzymin dynasty and brought the teachings of the Baal Shem Tov to Radzymin making it a Chasidic centre.

=== Leaders ===
- Yaakov Aryeh Guterman (1792-1874), founder and first leader (admur) of the Radzymin Hasidic dynasty.
- Shlomo Yehoshua David Guterman son of Rebbe Yaakov Aryeh the, second admur of Radzymin.
- Aharon Menachem Mendel Guterman (1860-1934), son of Rebbe Shlomo Yehoshua David, the third and last admur of Radzymin
