= Marecka Commuter Railway =

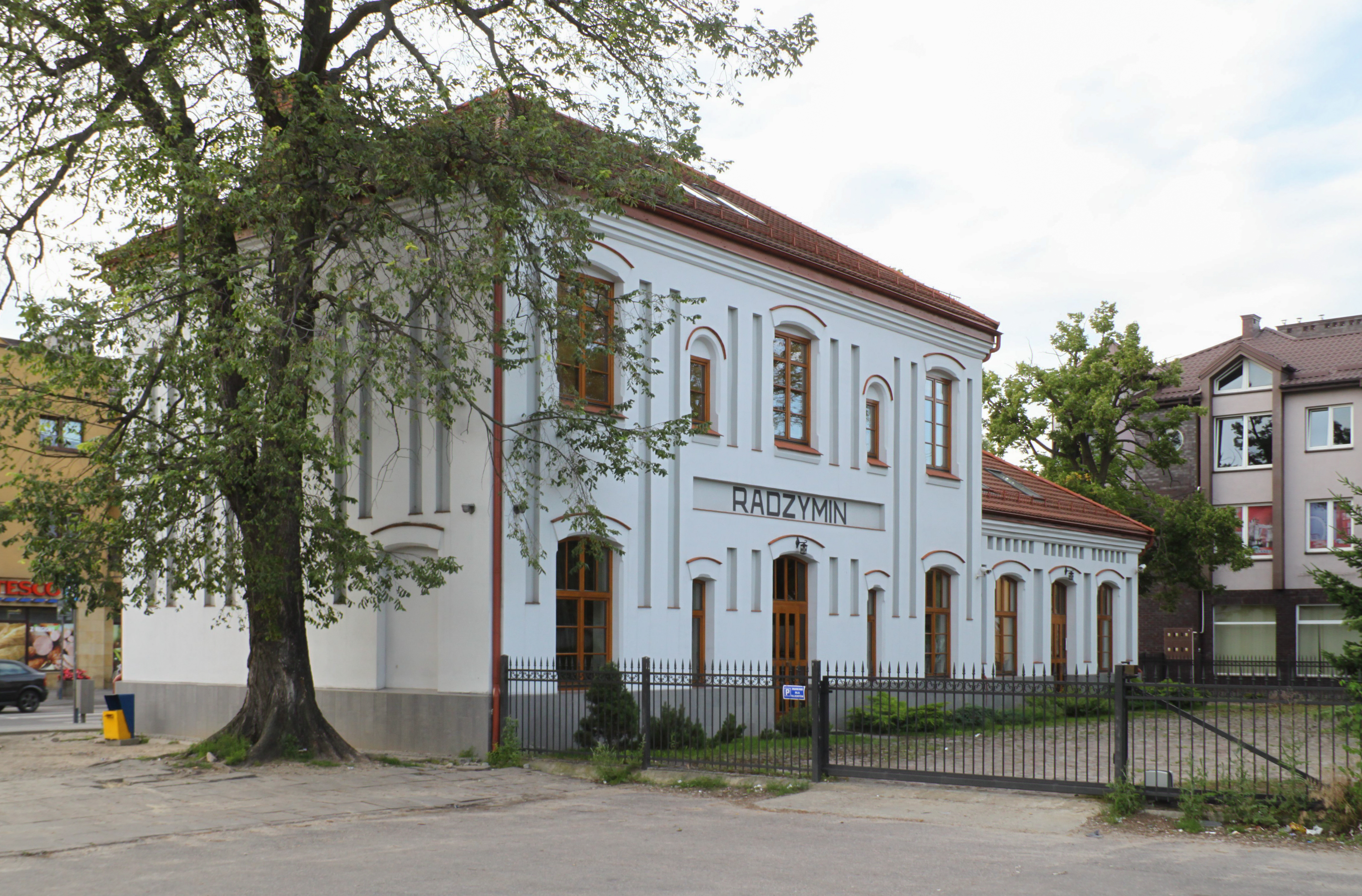
- Former terminus station building in Radzymin

Overview
- Status: Defunct
- Termini: Warszawa Targowa; Radzymin Wąskotorowy
- Stations: 12

Service
- Type: Commuter rail

History
- Opened: 1896
- Closed: 1 September 1974; 52 years ago

Technical
- Line length: 20 km (12 mi)
- Number of tracks: 1
- Track gauge: 750 mm (2 ft 5 1/2 in)
- Old gauge: 800 mm (2 ft 7 1/2 in)

The Marecka Commuter Railway (Polish: Marecka Kolej Dojazdowa) was a narrow gauge railway in Poland connecting Warsaw with Marki and Radzymin, it operated from 1896 to 1974. Originally built to 800 mm (2 ft 7 1/2 in) gauge, it was regauged to 750 mm (2 ft 5 1/2 in) in 1951.

== Route ==
Km	Mi	Station
0	0	Warszawa Targowa
0.731	0.454	Targówek
2.769	1.721	Warszawa Zacisze (before 1951 Zacisze)
5.373	3.339	Drewnica
7.386	4.589	Marki
9.226	5.733	Pustelnik I
10.086	6.267	Pustelnik II
12.36	7.68	Struga Warszawska
15.544	9.659	Słupno
17.171	10.670	Cmentarz Poległych
18.036	11.207	Leopoldynów
20	12	Radzymin Wąskotorowy
