= Radzymin =

Town in Masovian Voivodeship, Poland

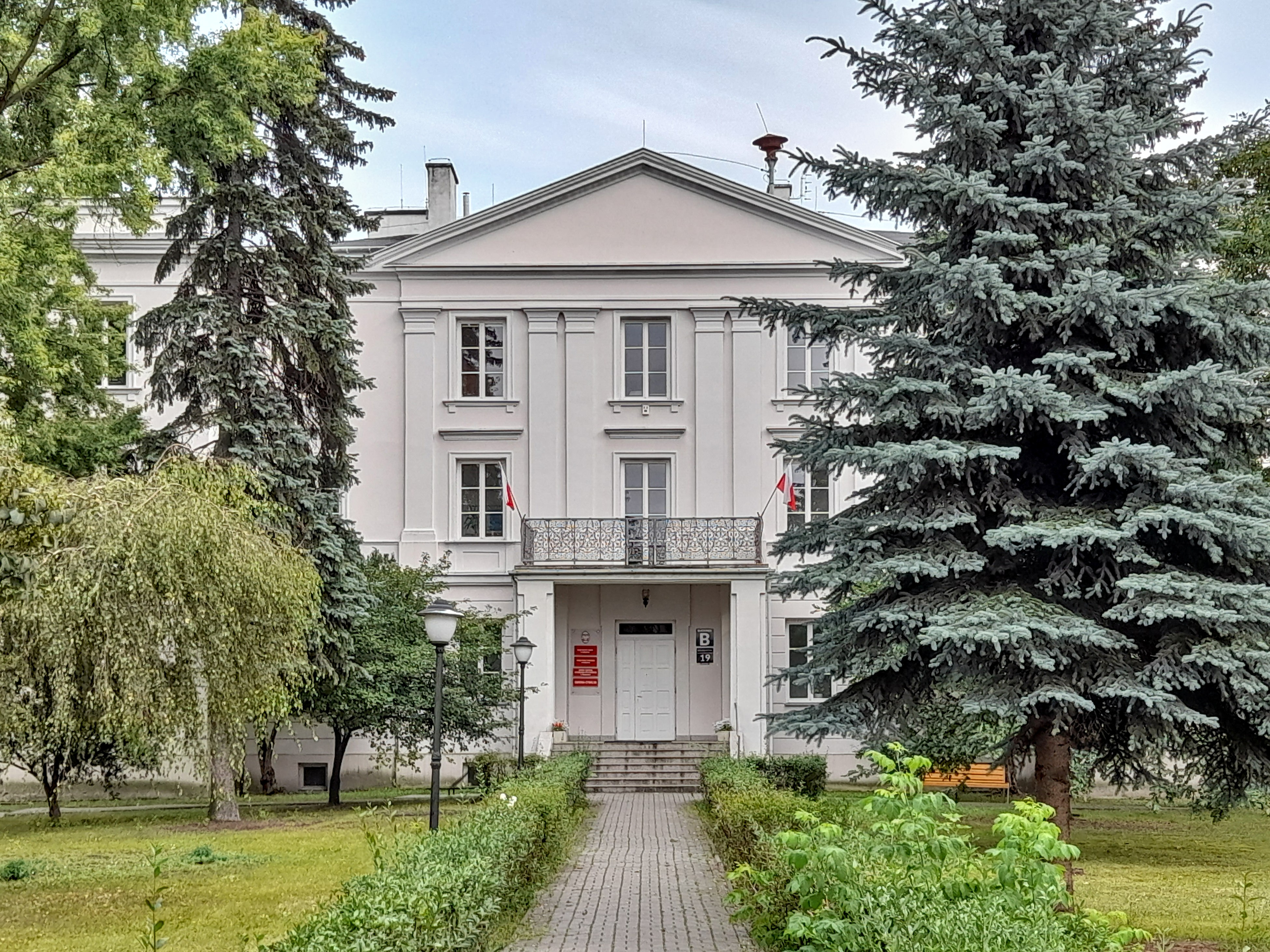
- Registry office in Radzymin

- Flag Coat of arms

- Location within Poland
- Coordinates: 52°25′N 21°11′E
- Country: Poland
- Voivodeship: Masovian
- County: Wołomin
- Gmina: Radzymin
- Established: 13th century
- Town rights: 1475

Government
  - Mayor: Krzysztof Chaciński

Area
  - Total: 23.32 km^{2} (9.00 sq mi)

Population (2008)
  - Total: 8,818
  - Density: 378.1/km^{2} (979.4/sq mi)
- Time zone: UTC+1 (CET)
  - Summer (DST): UTC+2 (CEST)
- Postal code: 05-250
- Area code: +48 22
- Car plates: WWL
- Website: http://radzymin.pl

Radzymin (pronounced [raˈd͡zɨ.min]) is a town in Poland and is one of the outer suburbs of the Warsaw metropolitan area. It is located in the powiat of Wołomin of the Masovian Voivodeship. The town has 8,818 inhabitants (as of 2008, but the surrounding commune is heavily populated and has an additional 11,000 inhabitants).

== History ==
Radzymin dates back to the Middle Ages. It was mentioned in a document of Duke Bolesław IV of Warsaw from 1440. It was granted a town charter in 1475. Since then, the town shared the fate of the nearby city of Warsaw, located only 25 kilometers (16 mi) away. It was a private town owned by Polish nobility, administratively located in the Warsaw County in the Masovian Voivodeship in the Greater Poland Province of the Kingdom of Poland.

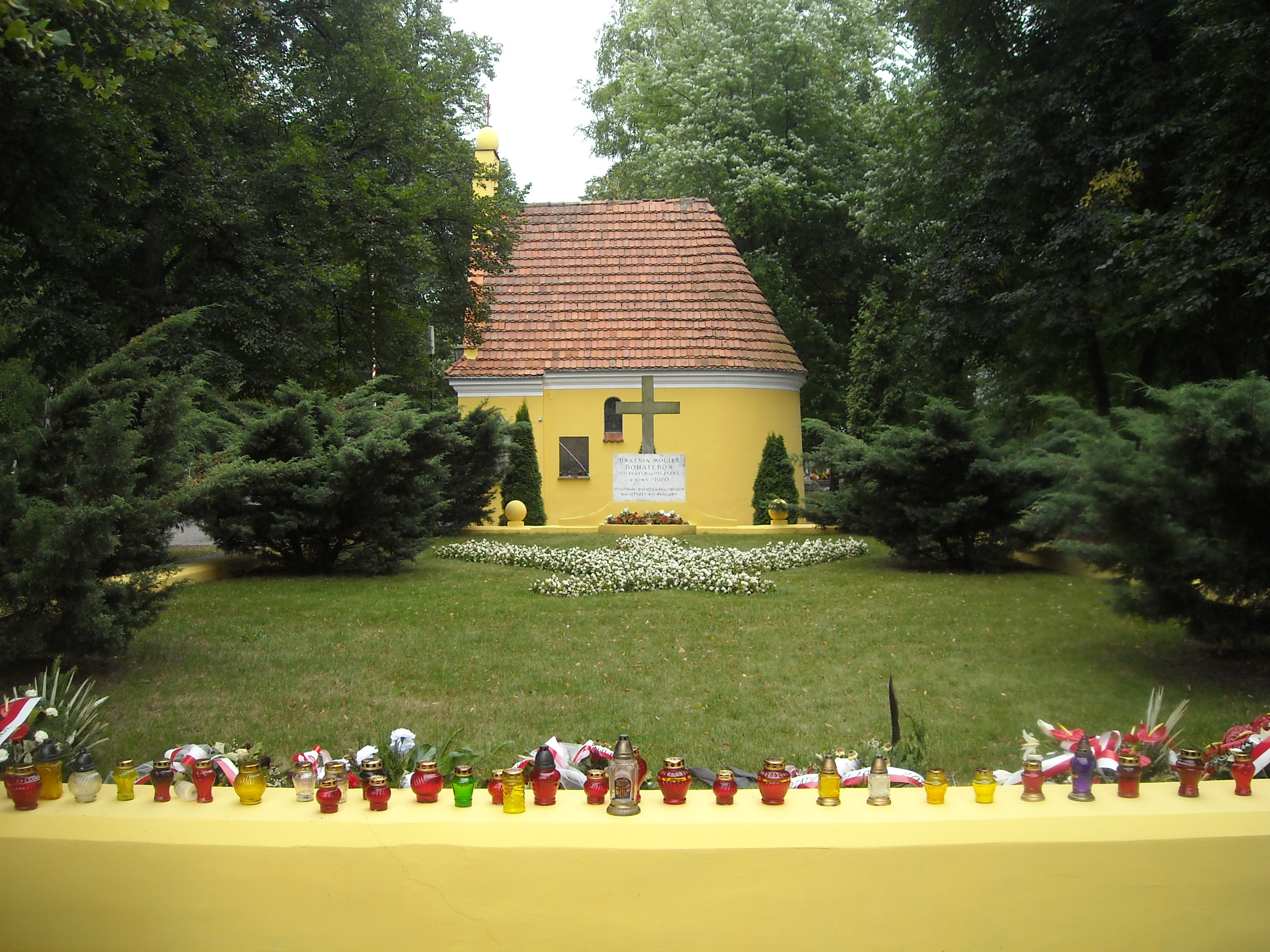
Grave of Polish troops fallen in the Battle of Radzymin (1920)

It was annexed by Prussia in the Third Partition of Poland in 1795. In 1807, it was regained by Poles and included within the newly formed, however short-lived Duchy of Warsaw. During the Austro–Polish War of 1809, it was the site of the Battle of Radzymin (1809), which ended in a Polish victory. Following the duchy's dissolution in 1815, the town fell to the Russian Partition of Poland. During the January uprising, on July 30, 1863, a skirmish between Polish insurgents and Russian soldiers took place there. Russian soldiers surrounded a Polish insurgent unit, but after a short battle the Poles managed to break through the encirclement and escape towards Kałuszyn. Following World War I, in 1918, Poland regained independence and control of the town. During the Polish–Soviet War, in August 1920, it was the site of the Battle of Radzymin (1920), in which Poles defeated the invading Russians.

Following the joint German-Soviet invasion of Poland, which started World War II in September 1939, the town was occupied by Germany. Several Poles who fought in the Battle of Radzymin in 1920 and further two local Poles were murdered by the Russians in the Katyn massacre in 1940. In August 1944, it was the site of the Battle of Radzymin (1944) between Germany and the advancing Soviet troops.

== Marecka Kolej Dojazdowa ==
The Marecka Kolej Dojazdowa (English: Marki Commuter Railway) was a narrow gauge railway in Poland connecting Warsaw with Marki and Radzymin active from 1896 to 1974.

== Sports ==
The local football club founded in 1923 is Mazur Radzymin. It competes in the lower leagues, and is currently co-funded by one of its players, rapper Quebonafide. In 2025, Mazur signed former Poland internationals Jakub Rzeźniczak and Grzegorz Krychowiak.

== Transport ==
Radzymin has a station on the Warsaw Northern Bypass Railway Line which runs from Tłuszcz to Legionowo.

== Notable residents ==
- Yaakov Aryeh Guterman (1792–1874), hasidic rebbe
- Jan Baudouin de Courtenay (1845–1929), linguist, best known for his theory of the phoneme and phonetic alternations
- Julian Ochorowicz (1850–1917), philosopher, psychologist, inventor, poet, and publicist
- Isaac Bashevis Singer (1903–1991), writer and Nobel laureate in Literature (born in Leoncin, but lived in Radzymin during his childhood though some sources claim Radzymin as his birthplace).
- Leon Weinstein (1910–2011), Polish resistance fighter
