= Marki =

Town in Masovian Voivodeship, Poland

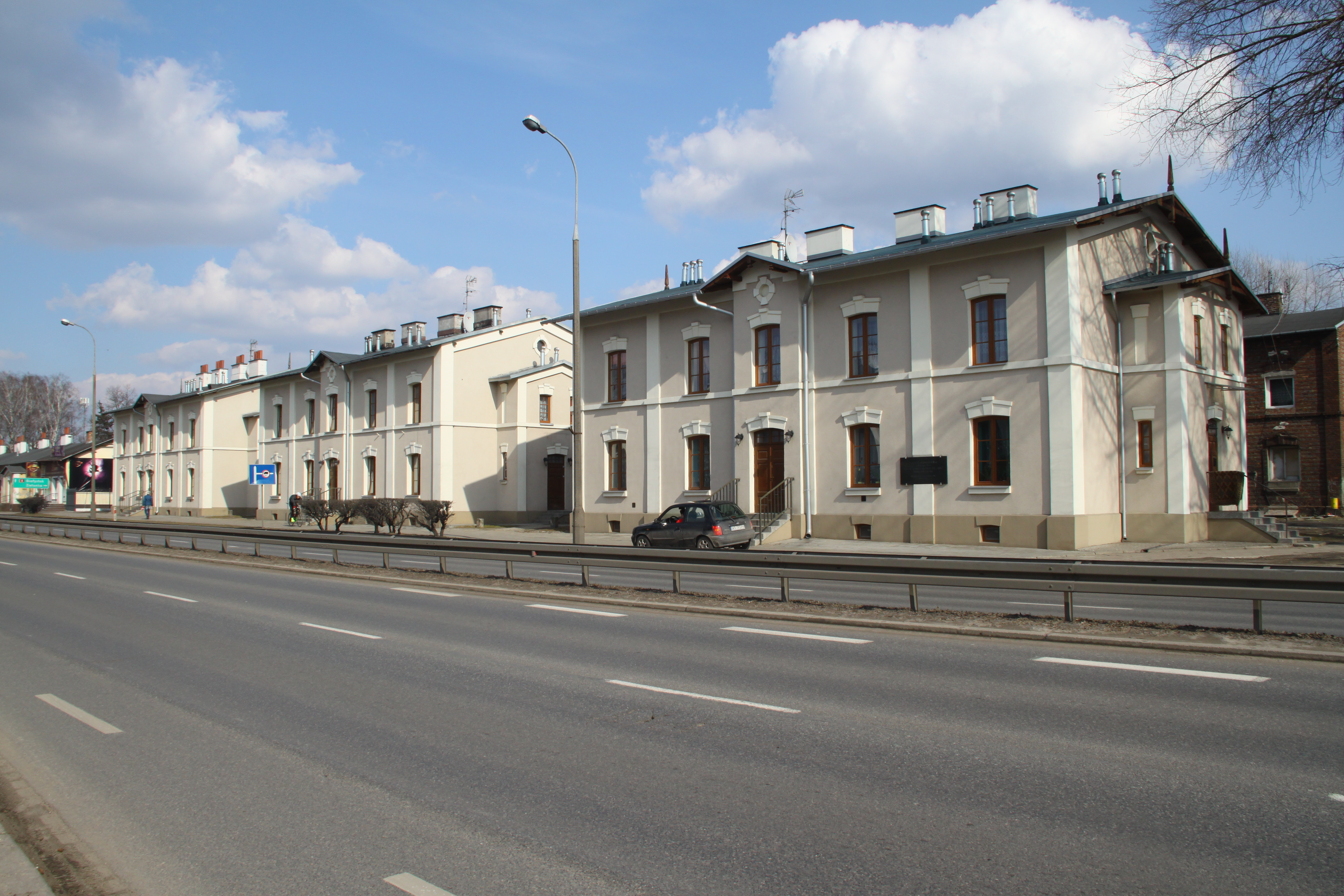
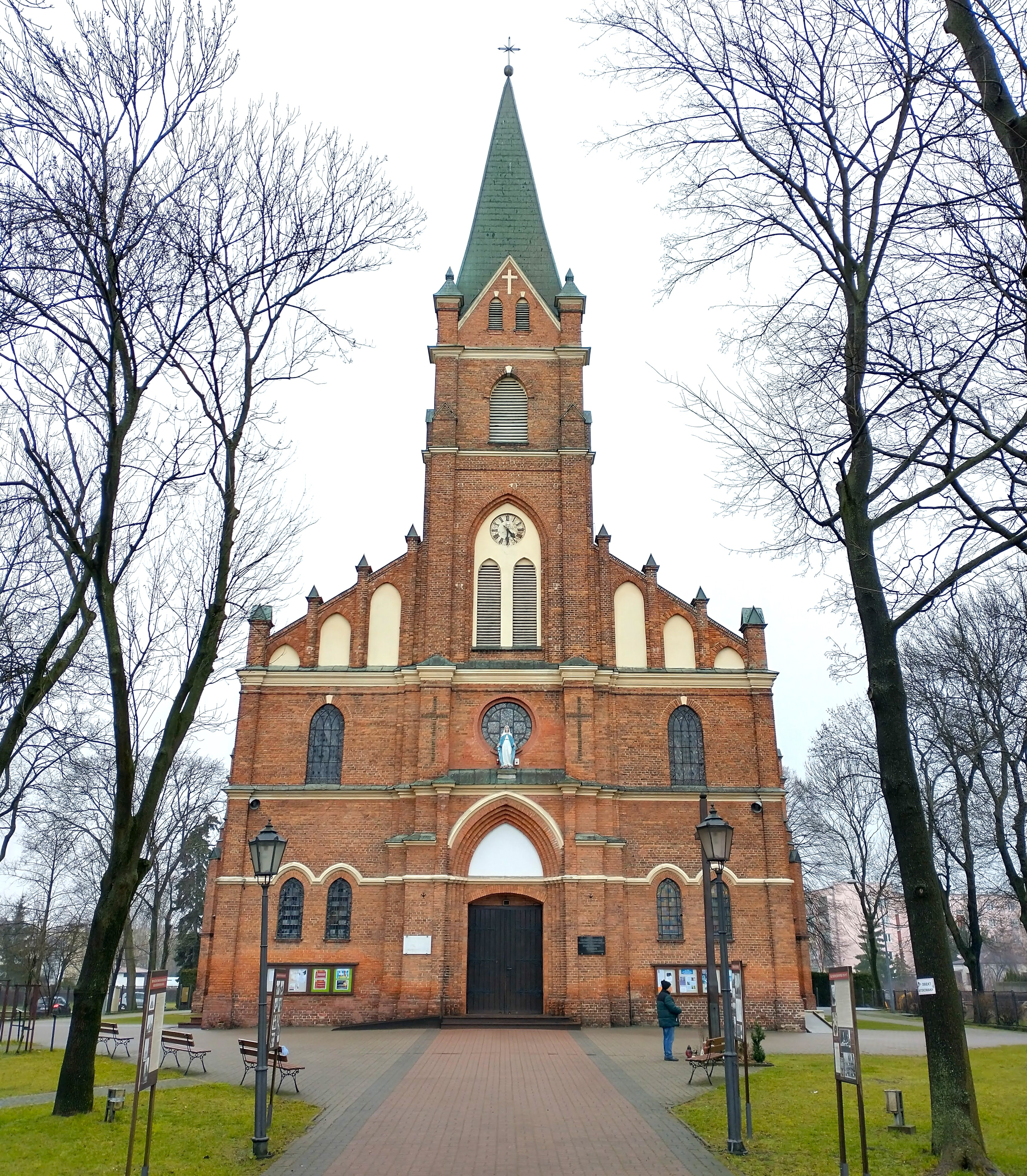
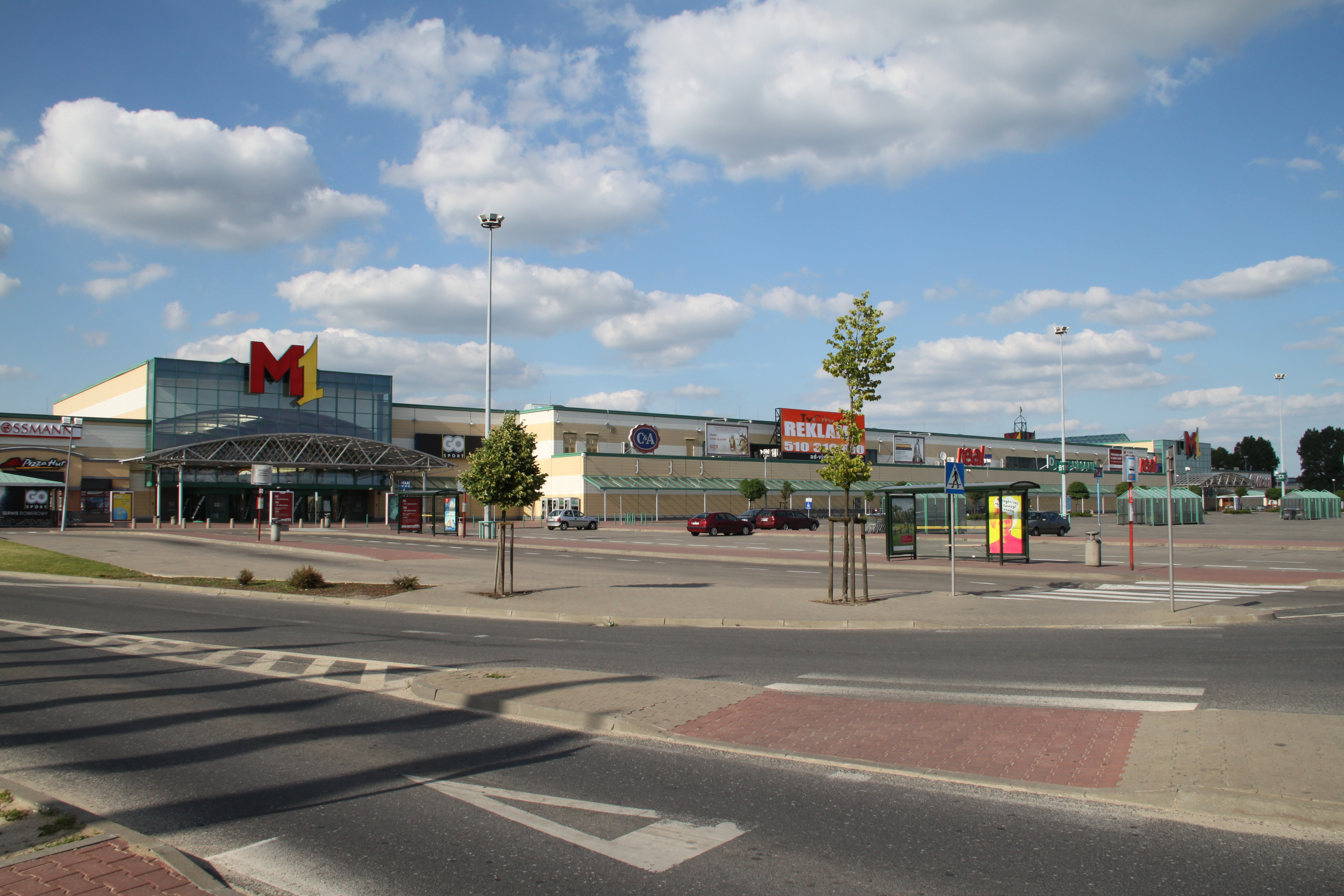
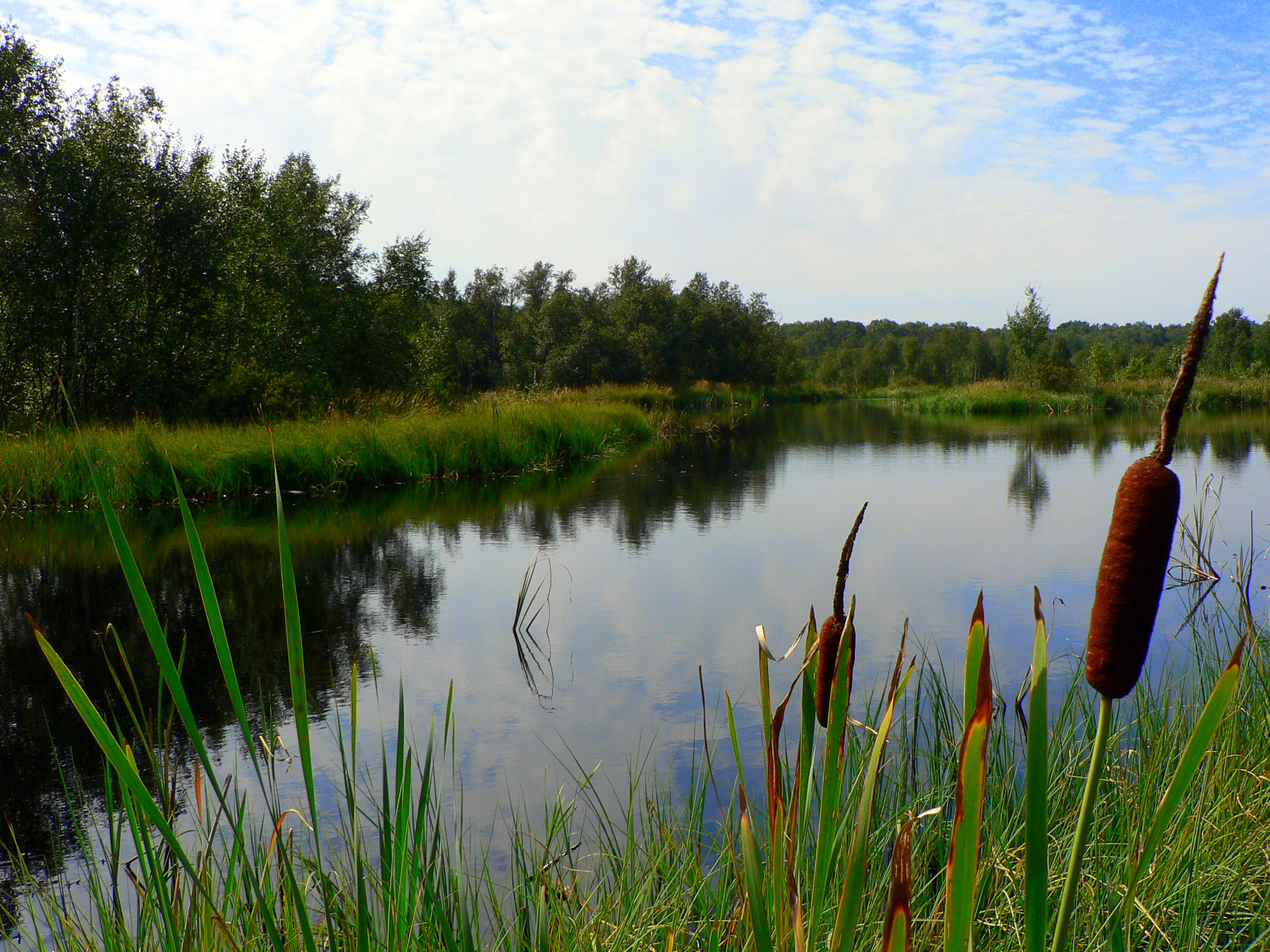
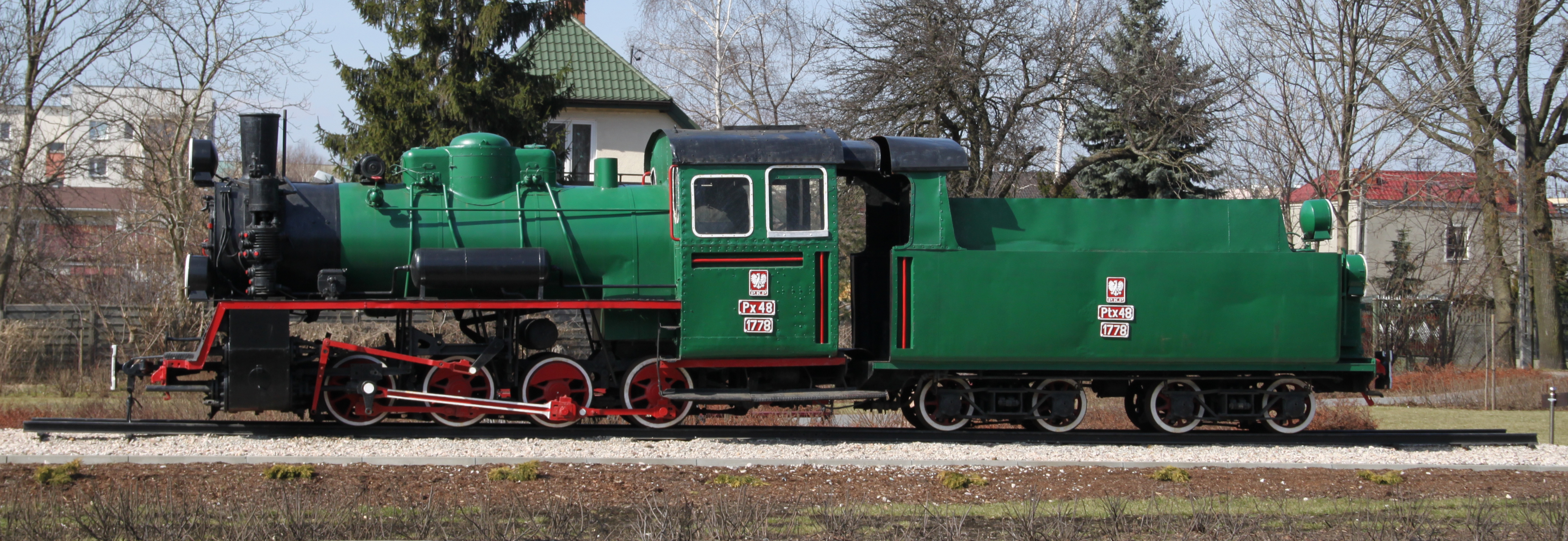
- Historic workers' houses Immaculate Conception church M1 shopping mall Horowe Bagno Nature Reserve Narrow gauge steam locomotive of Marecka Kolej Dojazdowa

- Coat of arms

- Location within Poland
- Coordinates: 52°20′N 21°6′E
- Country: Poland
- Voivodeship: Masovian
- County: Wołomin
- Gmina: Marki (urban gmina)
- Established: 16th century
- Town rights: 1967

Government
  - Mayor: Jacek Orych

Area
  - Total: 26.03 km^{2} (10.05 sq mi)

Population (2024)
  - Total: 45 876
  - Density: 1.7/km^{2} (4.5/sq mi)
- Time zone: UTC+1 (CET)
  - Summer (DST): UTC+2 (CEST)
- Postal code: 05-260, 05-261, 05-270
- Area code: +48 022
- Car plates: WWL
- Website: http://www.marki.pl

Marki (Polish pronunciation: [ˈmarkʲi]) is a town in central Poland, in the Warsaw metropolitan area in the Masovian Voivodeship, just northeast of the Polish capital Warsaw.

It was incorporated in 1967 and has approximately 31,000 residents.

== History ==
Following the joint German-Soviet invasion of Poland, which started World War II in September 1939, Marki was occupied by Germany until 1944. The Polish resistance movement was present in Marki, and there was a local branch of the Home Army. The Union of Retaliation carried out sabotage, cutting railway tracks in order to disrupt German transport.

The Marecka Kolej Dojazdowa (English: Marki Commuter Railway) was a narrow gauge railway connecting Warsaw with Marki and Radzymin from 1896 to 1974.

== Demographics ==
Historical population
| Year | Pop. | ±% |
|---|---|---|
| 1921 | 3,529 | — |
| 1960 | 13,417 | +280.2% |
| 2010 | 26,753 | +99.4% |
| 2024 | 45,876 | +71.5% |

== Gallery ==
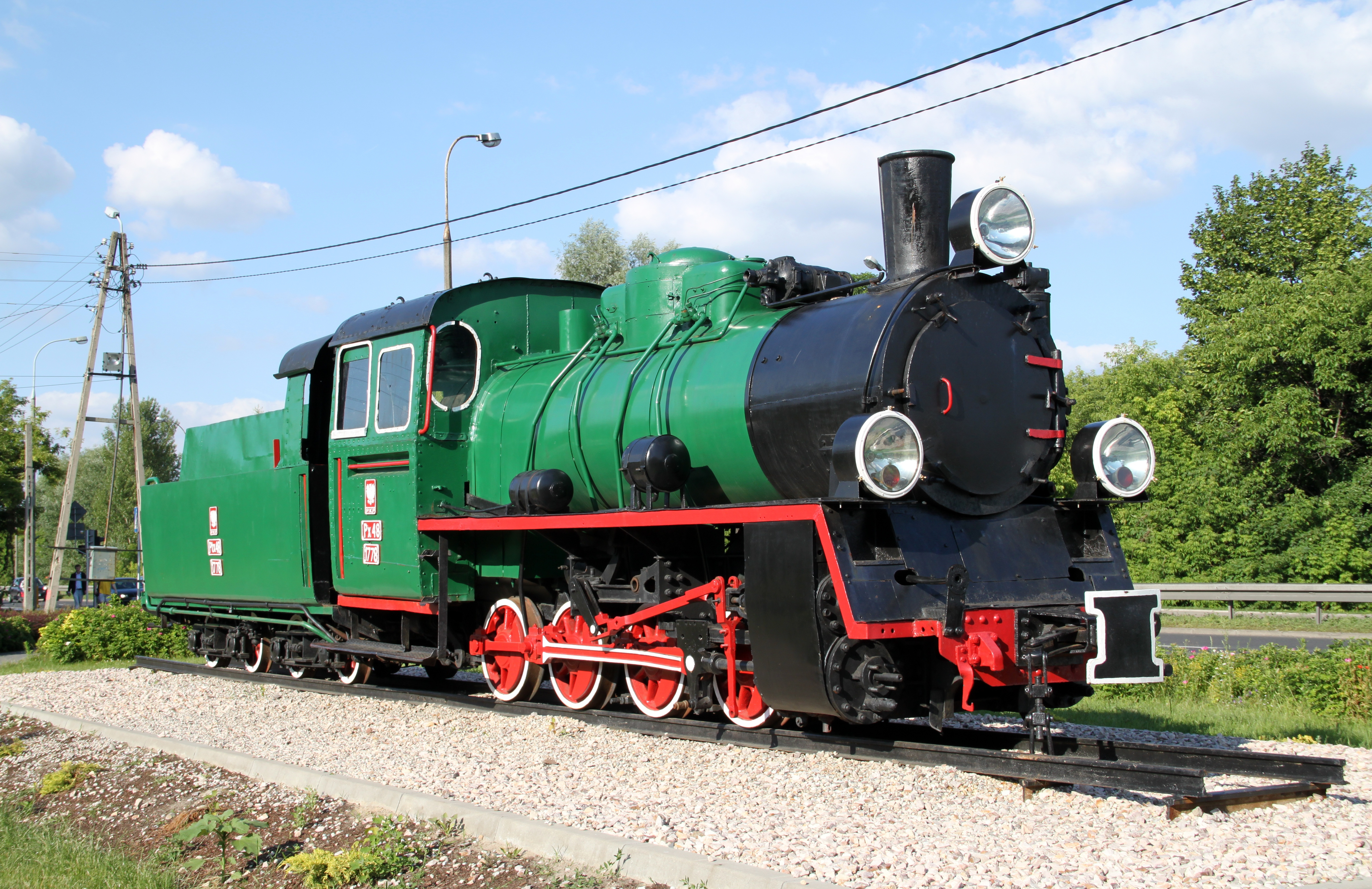
Narrow gauge steam locomotive Px48-1778 in the vicinity of City Hall honoring the Marecka Kolej Dojazdowa

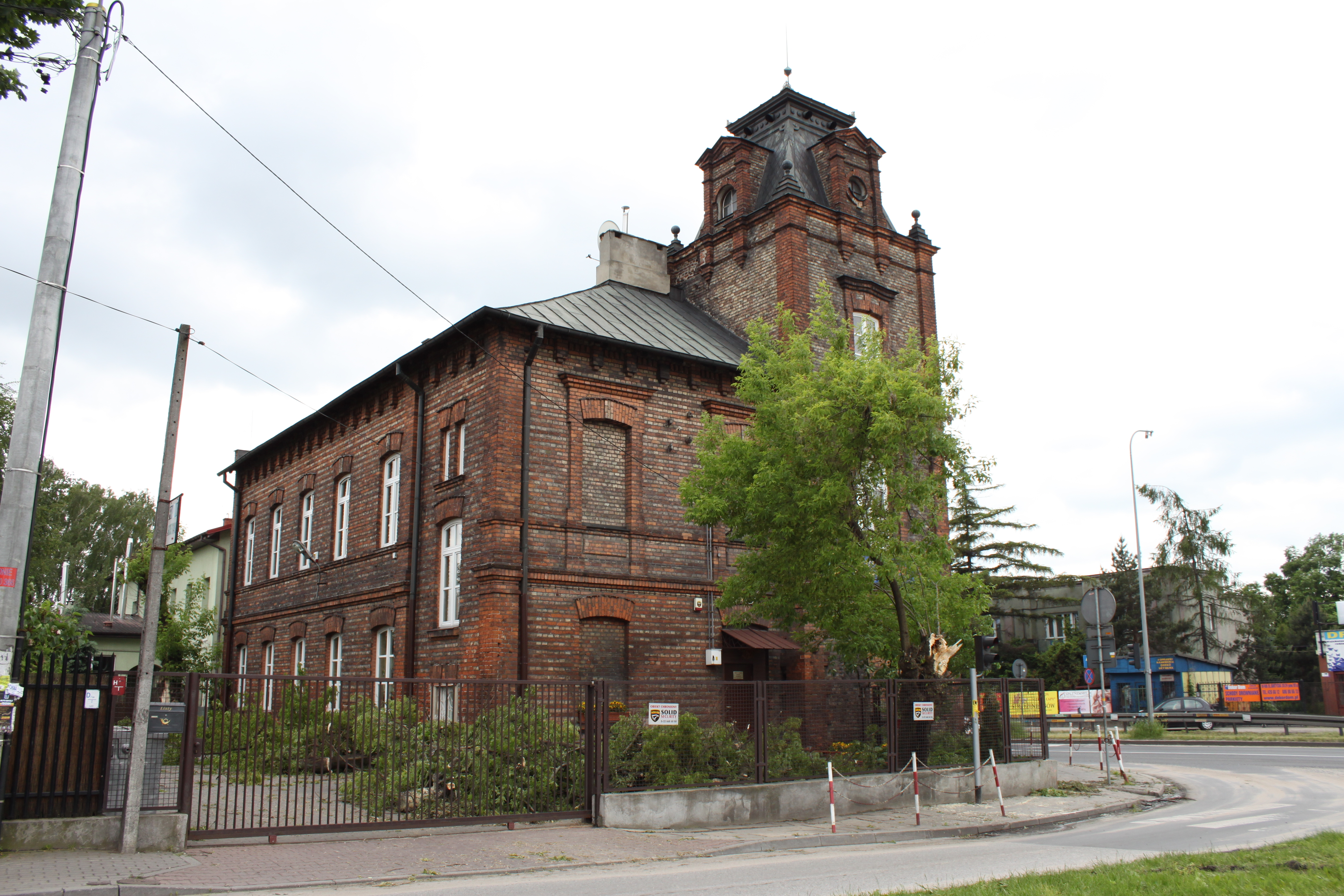
Marki Culture Center

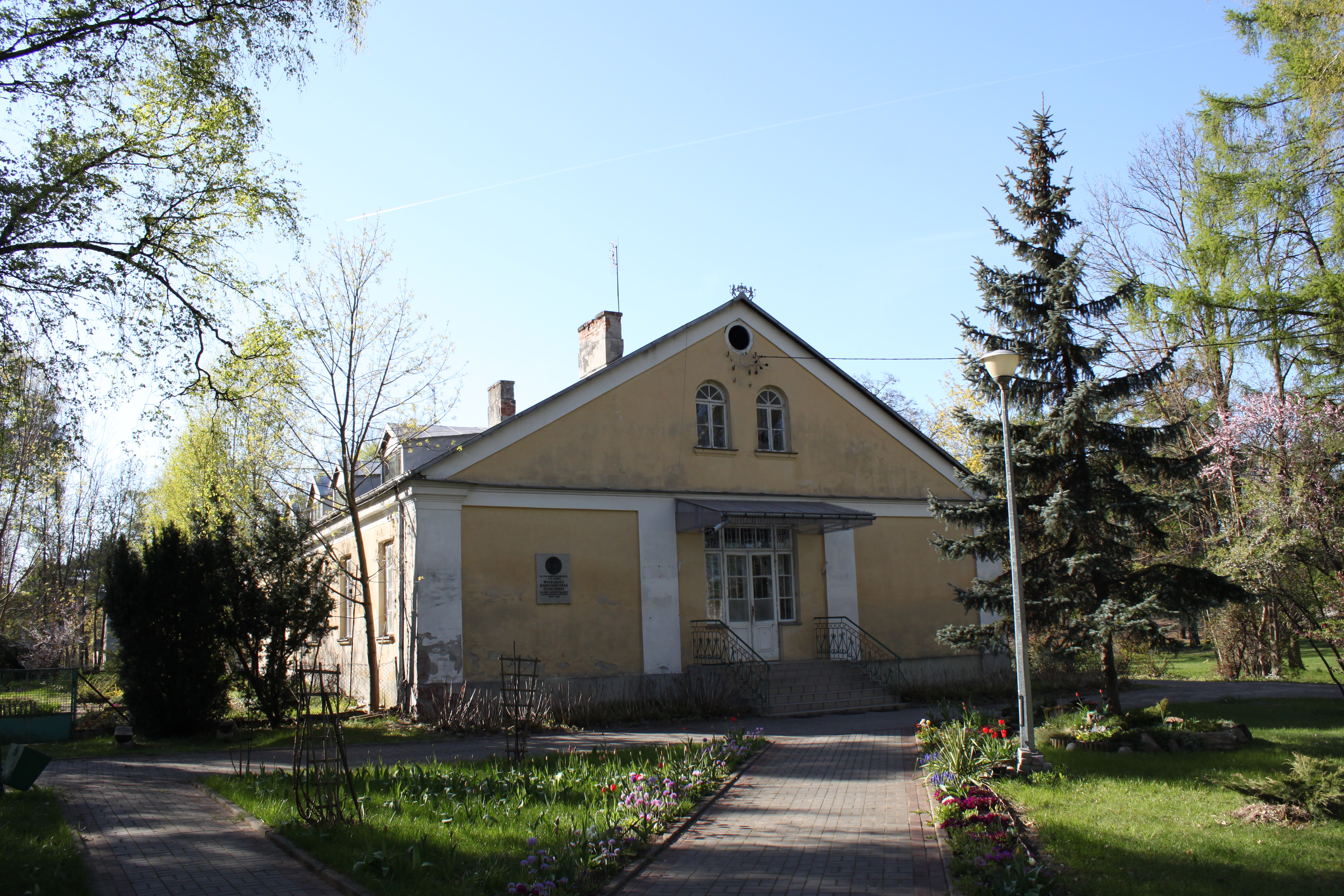
Former hospital where Mikalojus Konstantinas Čiurlionis died.

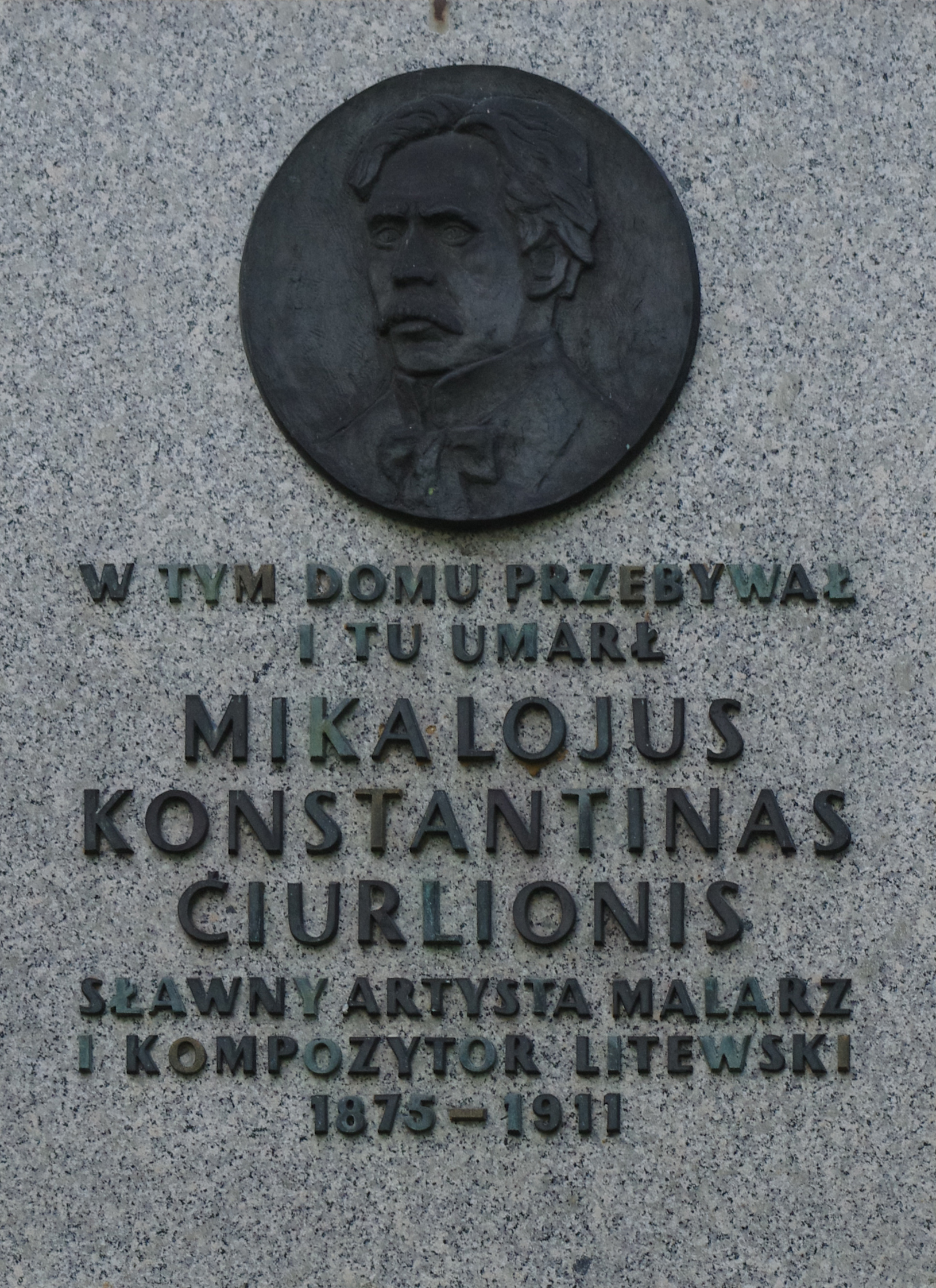
Commemorative plaque on the former hospital where Mikalojus Konstantinas Čiurlionis died.

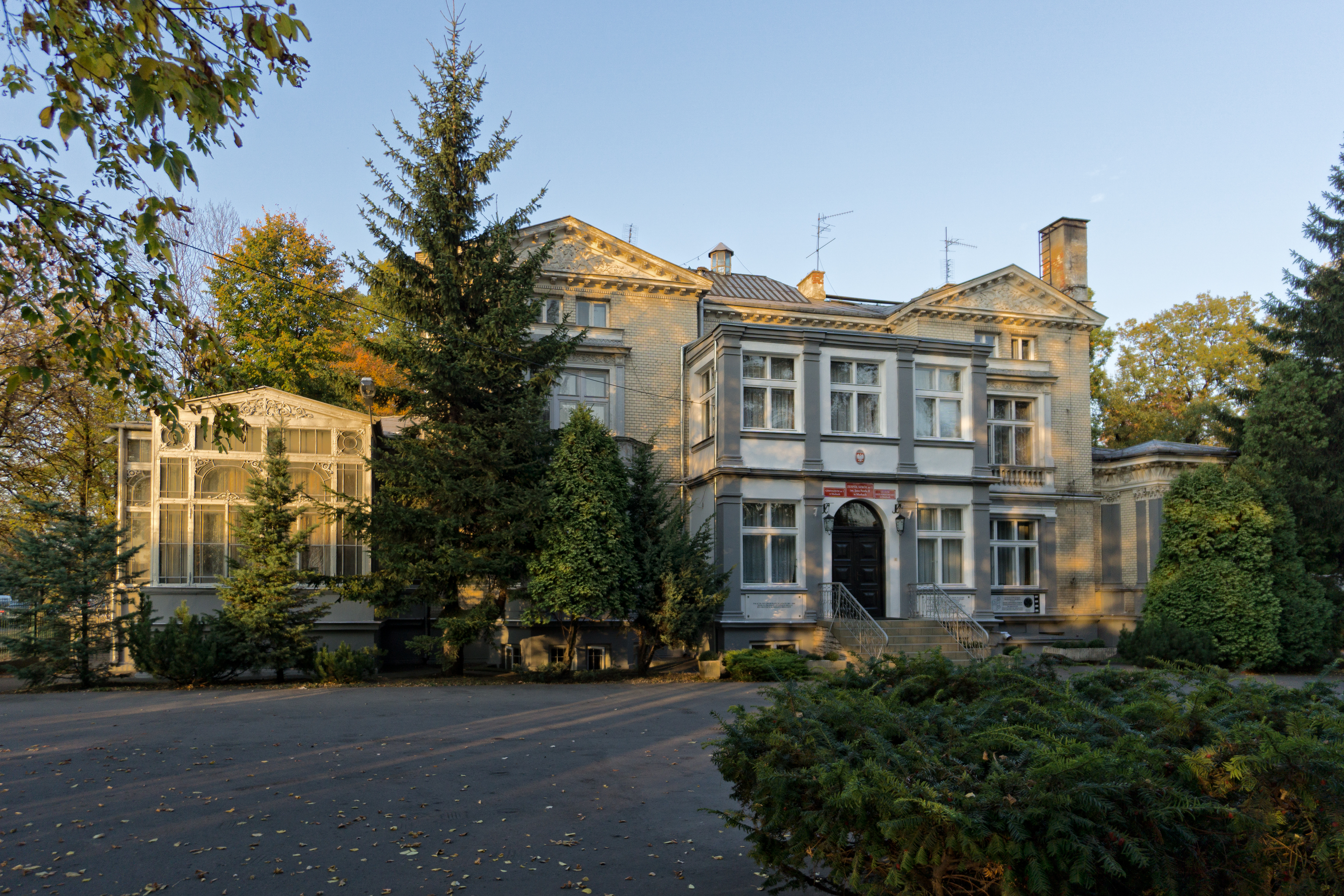
Briggs Palace, now a general education liceum

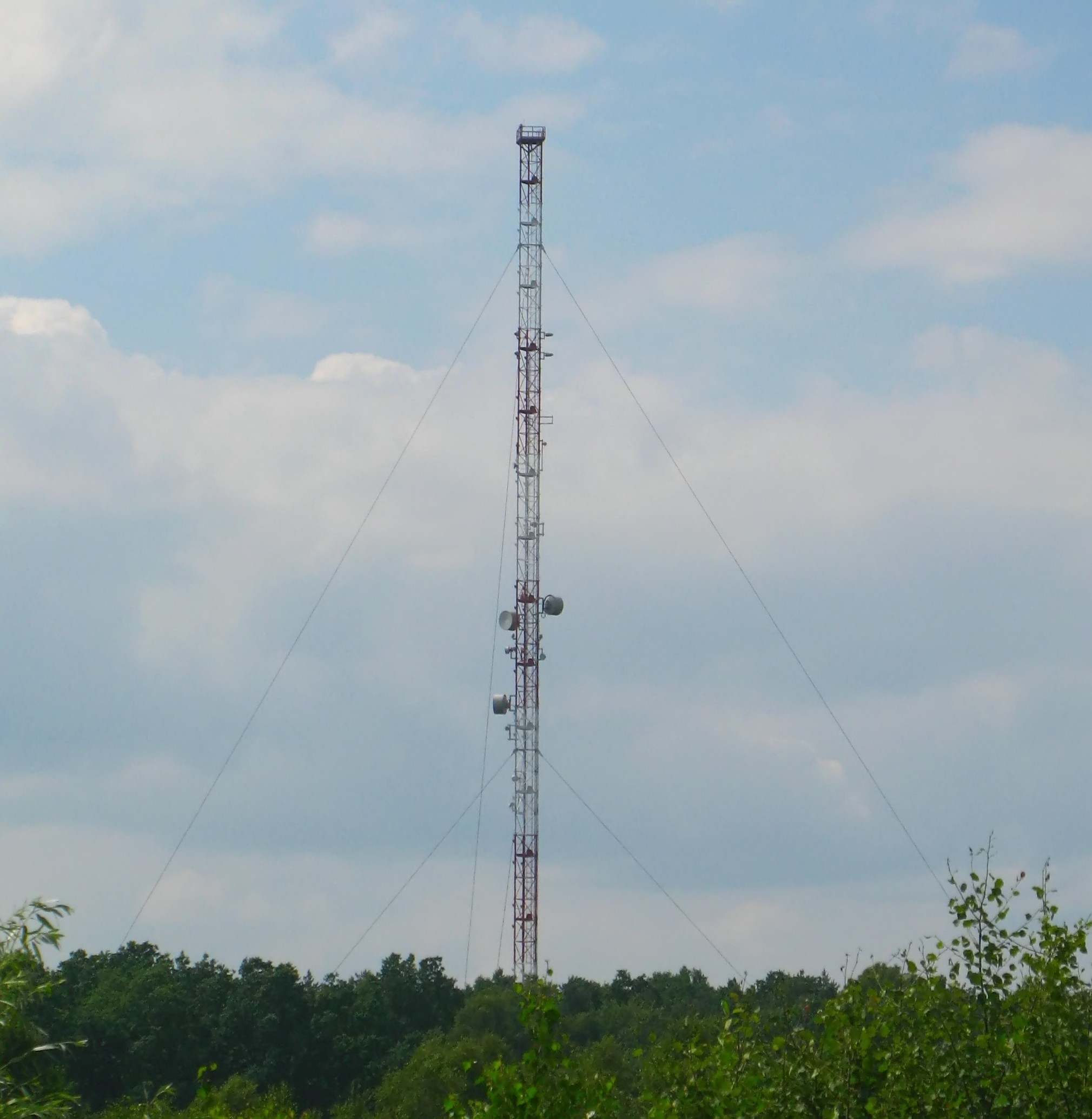
Marki Radio Relay Mast outside the town

== See also ==
- Horowe Bagno Nature Reserve
