= Leon Weinstein =

Warsaw Ghetto Uprising resistance fighter

- Born: Leon Chaim Lazer Weinstein; May 13, 1910; Radzymin, Poland
- Died: December 28, 2011 (aged 101); Los Angeles, California
- Known for: Warsaw Ghetto Uprising

León Chaim Lazer Weinstein (May 13, 1910 – December 28, 2011) was the oldest surviving resistance fighter of the 1943 Warsaw Ghetto Uprising. A member of the Jewish Combat Organization and later the Home Army during the later parts of World War II, Weinstein had previously served in the Polish Army in the early 1930s and again during the German invasion of Poland in 1939.

== Early life ==
Leon Chaim Lazer Weinstein was born on May 13, 1910, part of a Jewish family in the small town of Radzymin, 20 miles outside of Warsaw, Poland. At twelve years old, Weinstein became an apprentice to a local tailor. But he would soon run away from his family's village to Warsaw seeking better opportunities for employment. Continuing to work as a tailor, Weinstein saved a healthy sum to help his family and returned to Radzymin to rejoin his family by the age of 18. He began working as a foreman for a clothing manufacturer. Weinstein joined the Polish Army and served two years in the cavalry.

== World War II ==
As WWII broke out, Weinstein rejoined the Army in early September 1939 to fight with the Polish cavalry during German invasion of Poland. Captured near the Polish-Russian border, he was sent to a prison camp in Kovel, Ukraine. He escaped two months later and traveled the 600 miles to Radzymin by foot, arriving in September 1940.

He took an active part in the Jewish Combat Organization (Polish: Żydowska Organizacja Bojowa, ŻOB) under the leadership of Mordechai Anielewicz and Yitzhak Zuckerman. He obtained forged papers to regularly work outside his Jewish neighborhood. From there, he smuggled food, arms, and would recruit and train volunteers to fight.

In October 1942, through a tip, he found out that Jews in Radzymin were going to be taken. He tried to convince his extended family to run away but to no avail. On October 4, Weinstein escaped with his wife Sima and his 15-month-old daughter Natalie. Thousands of Jews from Radzymin were rounded up and sent via rail transport to Treblinka, a Nazi concentration camp in the northeast of Poland. This included the rest of his entire family including his grandparents, parents, sisters, and brothers, none of whom survived.

The Weinsteins headed for Warsaw. Life was not safe for their daughter. So her parents bundled her up, hung a gold cross around her neck, hoping Polish authorities would believe she was a Christian. They left her on the doorstep of an attorney who immediately took her to the Warsaw Police Station. Sima went into hiding, and Leon went back to fight with ŻOB in the Warsaw Ghetto. Leon would never learn of what happened to Sima.

=== Warsaw Uprising ===
Weinstein was responsible for smuggling weapons into the ghetto. The Warsaw Ghetto Uprising began on April 19, 1943 when German tanks began rolling into the Ghetto. The resistance lasted for 27 days.

Weinstein survived and escaped through the Warsaw sewage system. He crawled through the sewers for three days and managed to escape the Ghetto with six others who scattered in the non-Jewish part of the city. Weinstein was able to stay at a friend's house for the remainder of the war and worked for the Polish Underground Army. He would pose as a railroad worker to smuggle supplies and sabotage the rail system.

== Later life ==
After the war, he learned all his relatives had died. At war's end, for six months, Leon traveled across Poland on his bicycle, searching one convent orphanage after another. After visiting many, he spotted Natalie and immediately recognized her. He was able to confirm the identification by her birthmark above her hip. Natalie was four years old. In 1947, he moved to France with his wife Sophie. They later emigrated to the United States in 1952.

== Personal life ==
He married Sophie, a survivor of the Auschwitz concentration camp in 1947. They had a son named Michael. Weinstein died in Los Angeles, California on December 28, 2011.
