= January Revolution =

January Revolution may refer to:

- Janeirinha, Portugal (1868)
- January Storm, China (1967), also known as the January Revolution
- Egyptian Revolution of 2011
- 2022 Kazakh protests
- 2025–2026 Iranian protests, sometimes referred to as the January 2026 Revolution of Iran.

== See also ==
- January Uprising (disambiguation)
