= Horowe Bagno Nature Reserve =

Nature reserve in Marki, Poland

Coordinates: 52°18′N 21°06′E

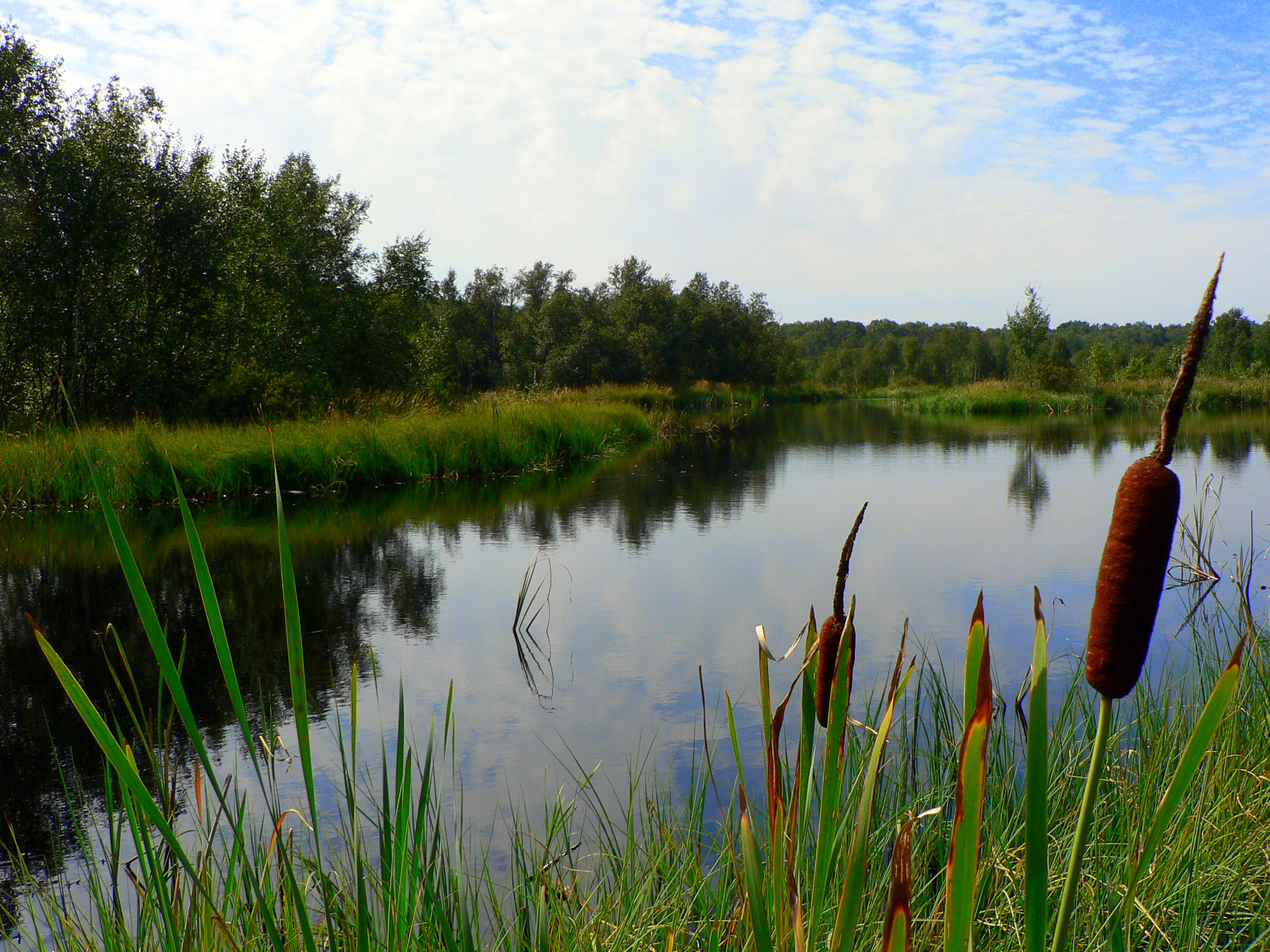
Horowe Bagno lake

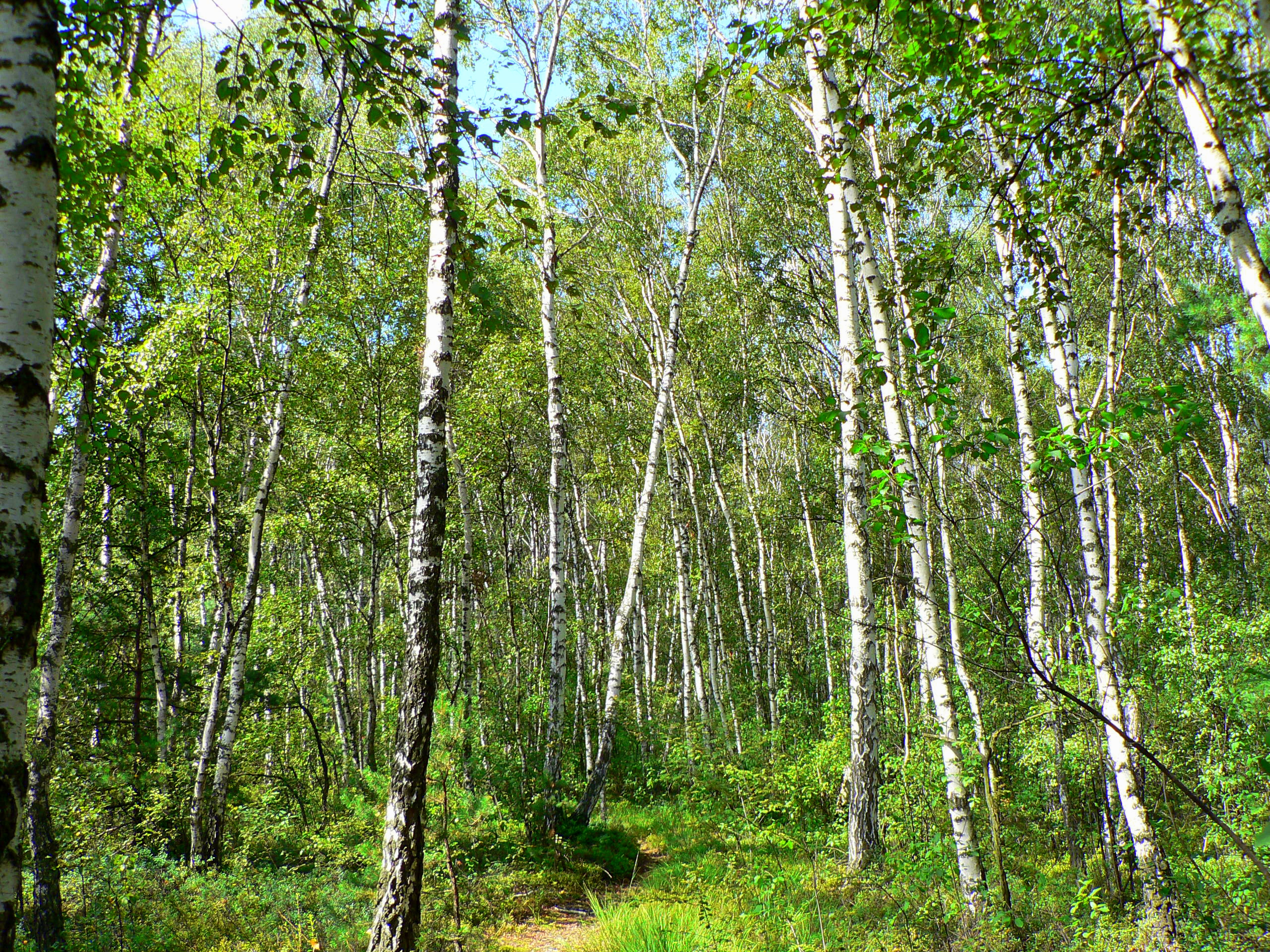
The reserve is mostly covered in woods

Horowe Bagno is a peat nature reserve in Marki near Warsaw in Poland. The area of the reserve is 43,82 ha.
