= January Uprising (disambiguation) =

The January Uprising was an 1863 insurrection against Russian imperial rule in Lithuania and Poland.

January Uprising may also refer to:

- Kiev Arsenal January Uprising, a 1918 workers' revolt during the Ukrainian–Soviet War
- Spartacist uprising, a 1919 uprising in Berlin during the German Revolution

== See also ==
- January Revolution (disambiguation)
