= Waganka =

- Village
- Location within Poland
- Coordinates: 52°28′15″N 21°28′26″E
- Country: Poland
- Voivodeship: Masovian
- County: Wołomin
- Gmina: Tłuszcz

Waganka [vaˈɡaŋka] is a village in the administrative district of Gmina Tłuszcz, within Wołomin County, Masovian Voivodeship, in east-central Poland.
