= Jadwinin, Masovian Voivodeship =

Jadwinin
- Village
- Location within Poland
- Coordinates: 52°23′54″N 21°25′18″E
- Country: Poland
- Voivodeship: Masovian
- County: Wołomin
- Gmina: Tłuszcz
- Population: 100

Jadwinin [jadˈvinin] is a village in the administrative district of Gmina Tłuszcz, within Wołomin County, Masovian Voivodeship, in east-central Poland.
