= Pawłów, Wołomin County =

Pawłów
- Village
- Location within Poland
- Coordinates: 52°23′44″N 21°28′30″E
- Country: Poland
- Voivodeship: Masovian
- County: Wołomin
- Gmina: Tłuszcz

Pawłów [ˈpavwuf] is a village in the administrative district of Gmina Tłuszcz, within Wołomin County, Masovian Voivodeship, in east-central Poland.
