= Rysie, Wołomin County =

Rysie
- Village
- Location within Poland
- Coordinates: 52°27′6″N 21°26′31″E
- Country: Poland
- Voivodeship: Masovian
- County: Wołomin
- Gmina: Tłuszcz
- Elevation: 98 m (322 ft)

Rysie [ˈrɨɕɛ] is a village in the administrative district of Gmina Tłuszcz, within Wołomin County, Masovian Voivodeship, in east-central Poland.
