= Gmina Tłuszcz =

Gmina Tłuszcz Tłuszcz Commune
- Gmina
- Coat of arms

- Location within Poland
- Coordinates (Tłuszcz): 52°26′N 21°27′E
- Country: Poland
- Voivodeship: Masovian
- County: Wołomin
- Seat: Tłuszcz

Area
  - Total: 102.83 km^{2} (39.70 sq mi)

Population (2013)
  - Total: 19,551
  - Density: 190.13/km^{2} (492.43/sq mi)
  - Urban: 7,989
  - Rural: 11,562
- Website: http://www.tluszcz.pl

Gmina Tłuszcz is an urban-rural gmina (administrative district) in Wołomin County, Masovian Voivodeship, in east-central Poland. Its seat is the town of Tłuszcz, which lies approximately 18 kilometres (11 mi) north-east of Wołomin and 39 km (24 mi) north-east of Warsaw.

The gmina covers an area of 102.83 square kilometres (39.7 sq mi), and as of 2006 its total population is 18,510 (out of which the population of Tłuszcz amounts to 7,283, and the population of the rural part of the gmina is 11,227).

== Villages ==
Apart from the town of Tłuszcz, Gmina Tłuszcz contains the villages and settlements of Białki, Brzezinów, Chrzęsne, Dzięcioły, Franciszków, Grabów, Jadwinin, Jarzębia Łąka, Jasienica, Jaźwie, Kozły, Kury, Łysobyki, Mokra Wieś, Pawłów, Postoliska, Rudniki, Rysie, Stasinów, Stryjki, Szczepanek, Szymanówek, Wagan, Waganka, Wólka Kozłowska and Zalesie.

== Neighbouring gminas ==
Gmina Tłuszcz is bordered by the gminas of Dąbrówka, Jadów, Klembów, Poświętne, Strachówka and Zabrodzie.
