= Rudniki, Wołomin County =

Rudniki
- Village
- Location within Poland
- Coordinates: 52°24′6″N 21°30′23″E
- Country: Poland
- Voivodeship: Masovian
- County: Wołomin
- Gmina: Tłuszcz
- Population: 150

Rudniki [rudˈniki] is a village in the administrative district of Gmina Tłuszcz, within Wołomin County, Masovian Voivodeship, in east-central Poland.
