= Kozły, Masovian Voivodeship =

Kozły
- Village
- Location within Poland
- Coordinates: 52°27′N 21°24′E
- Country: Poland
- Voivodeship: Masovian
- County: Wołomin
- Gmina: Tłuszcz

Kozły [ˈkɔzwɨ] is a village in the administrative district of Gmina Tłuszcz, within Wołomin County, Masovian Voivodeship, in east-central Poland.
