= Jasienica, Wołomin County =

Jasienica
- Village

- Location within Poland
- Coordinates: 52°24′N 21°23′E
- Country: Poland
- Voivodeship: Masovian
- County: Wołomin
- Gmina: Tłuszcz
- Population: 3,133

Jasienica [jaɕɛˈnit͡sa] is a village in the administrative district of Gmina Tłuszcz, within Wołomin County, Masovian Voivodeship, in east-central Poland.

== Description ==
The village is situated on the Cienka river. There are: the railway station (Jasienica Mazowiecka), primary school, middle school, kindergarten, public library, fire brigade, church and park (a remnant of the farm) in the village. There are three railway bridges, four road bridges (including one on the regional road), footbridges and fords on the Cienka river.

Regional road No. 634 runs through the village.

Two railway lines cross seamlessly (viaduct of a single-track line) in the village: - double-track line Zielonka - Kuźnica Białystocka, - single-track line Krusze - Pilawa with a branch line Jasienica Mazowiecka - Tłuszcz

== History ==
The history of Jasienica dates back at least to the beginning of the 15th century i.e. to the time of colonization of Mazovia (Jasienica belonged to the Warsaw County and to the Warsaw Land of the Duchy of Masovia, while Tłuszcz to the Kamieniec County of the Nur Land. There are documents from this period which concern sales of Jasienica or its parts e.g. from years: 1414, 1414/1415, 1418 etc. Jasienica is mentioned there as: "Jassenicza", "Jassyenyecz", "Jassyenicza", "Jaszenicza", "Jaszenecz", "Jasiennica", "Jasszenicza", "Jassyeniecz", "Jaschenyecz", "Jasyenyecz", "Jassenycza"," Jaschyenycze", "Jasyenycza", "Yasszyennycza".

At the beginning of the 15th century, Knight Świętosław from Pruszków (from the Pierzchała family) received - in recognition of his contribution to the Mazovian Ducal Court - areas covering Jasienica. Around 1470, after the death of Świętosław, Jasienica was inherited by one of his sons - probably - Andrew, who having settled in this area took the name Klembowski (also Kłębowski) after - Klembów, the village which also became his property.

After the incorporation of Mazovia into the Polish Crown in 1526, Jasienica was in the Mazovian Voivodeship, the Warsaw County and in the Warsaw Land.

Jasienica was the village of impoverished noblemen. It was owned later by Stanisław Klembowski, Stanisław and Piotr Czosnowski, Dominik Sobolewski.

== Notable residents and natives ==
- Wojciech Lemański (born 1960), a suspended Roman Catholic priest
