= Szczepanek, Masovian Voivodeship =

Szczepanek
- Village
- Location within Poland
- Coordinates: 52°23′N 21°26′E
- Country: Poland
- Voivodeship: Masovian
- County: Wołomin
- Gmina: Tłuszcz
- Population: 720

Szczepanek [ʂt͡ʂɛˈpanɛk] is a village in the administrative district of Gmina Tłuszcz, within Wołomin County, Masovian Voivodeship, in east-central Poland.
