= Zalesie, Wołomin County =

Zalesie
- Village
- Location within Poland
- Coordinates: 52°27′22″N 21°30′19″E
- Country: Poland
- Voivodeship: Masovian
- County: Wołomin
- Gmina: Tłuszcz

Zalesie [zaˈlɛɕɛ] is a village in the administrative district of Gmina Tłuszcz, within Wołomin County, Masovian Voivodeship, in east-central Poland.
