= Stasinów, Masovian Voivodeship =

Stasinów
- Village
- Location within Poland
- Coordinates: 52°23′42″N 21°27′54″E
- Country: Poland
- Voivodeship: Masovian
- County: Wołomin
- Gmina: Tłuszcz

Stasinów [staˈɕinuf] is a village in the administrative district of Gmina Tłuszcz, within Wołomin County, Masovian Voivodeship, in east-central Poland.
