= Wojciech Lemański =

Polish Roman Catholic priest

Wojciech Michał Lemański
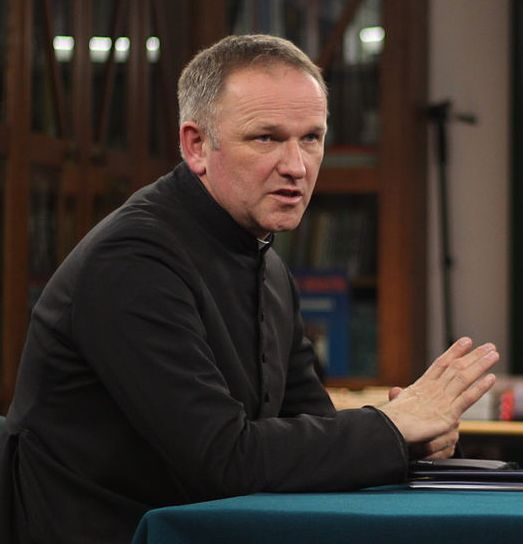
- Born: 22 September 1960 (age 66); Legionowo
- Occupation: priest

Wojciech Michał Lemański (born 22 September 1960) is a Polish priest of the Roman Catholic Church who was ordered by his superior, Archbishop Henryk Hoser, to leave his parish for disobedience and for failing to comply with some of the teachings of the Catholic Church.

== Biography ==
First Mgr. Hoser banned Lemański from teaching religious studies in public schools. On 7 July 2013, he asked Lemański, then 52 years old, to leave the parish and move to a residence for retired priests. He was also given the option of transfer to another parish to serve as auxiliary staff. Lemański did not agree with the decision and said that he would appeal it. In June 2014 he was made chaplain in an institution for mentally injured children. Two months later he was suspended from the priesthood.

== Critique of the Church ==
Lemański, ordained in 1987, has repeatedly criticised the church. He has accused the church leadership of not doing enough to oppose anti-Semitic tendencies among Poland's Catholics. He is one of the few Catholic priests who participate in the annual commemoration of the massacres of Jews at the Treblinka camp, where Jews, along with Poles and others, were gassed. He also recovered gravestones from abandoned and destroyed Jewish cemeteries, incorporating two of them into the main altar of his church. Some conservative Catholics said he was turning it into a synagogue.

Lemański has also criticized the establishment's lenient treatment of clerics accused of sexual abuse and its rejection of artificial insemination and contraceptives.

== Suspension ==
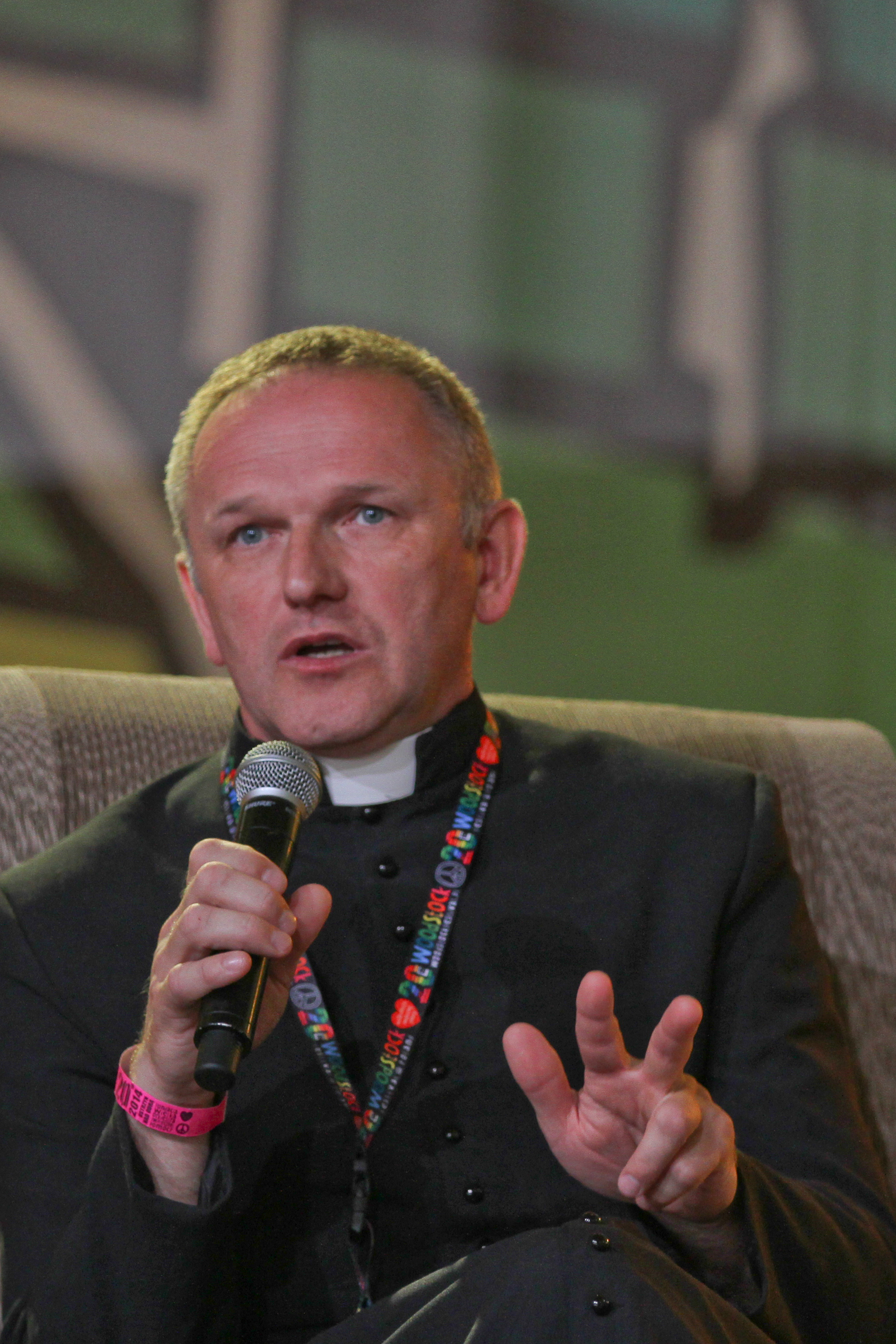
Wojciech Lemański at the Woodstock Festival 2014

In July 2013, Lemański was suspended by the archbishop of Warsaw-Praga Henryk Hoser. On 14 July 2013, when three envoys dispatched by Hoser showed up at Lemanski's church in the town of Jasienica near Warsaw, an angry crowd surrounded them and they retreated after they were jeered at and booed. They barely managed to get into their car when the crowd began pushing the vehicle in the direction of Warsaw.

Lemański, who originally did not want to yield, eventually decided to resign, although he still considered the bishop's decision unfair. "Today you are pushing a car, but tomorrow you will flip it over or possibly even hurt somebody," he told his parishioners. He then left the parsonage saying he would wait for a decision from the Vatican.

A few days later, front-page articles about the case appeared in the Polish edition of Newsweek and in Gazeta Wyborcza. At the end of June 2014, Hoser changed his earlier decision and posted Lemański as a chaplain in an institution for mentally injured children. Lemański continued his activities and took part in Przystanek Woodstock music festival. On 22 August 2014, he was suspended from being a priest altogether, the reason being a lack of regret over his deeds in the past and breaking the ban on talking to the media, imposed by the Vatican.

== Awards ==
In 2008, Lemański received the Order of Polonia Restituta from former Polish president Lech Kaczyński for keeping the memory of Polish Jews alive.
