= Białki, Wołomin County =

Białki
- Village
- Location within Poland
- Coordinates: 52°25′N 21°33′E
- Country: Poland
- Voivodeship: Masovian
- County: Wołomin
- Gmina: Tłuszcz

Białki [ˈbjau̯ki] is a village in the administrative district of Gmina Tłuszcz, within Wołomin County, Masovian Voivodeship, in east-central Poland.

The population of Białki village, Wołomin County in the 2021 census was approximately 237 people.
