= Stryjki, Masovian Voivodeship =

Stryjki
- Village
- Location within Poland
- Coordinates: 52°25′10″N 21°29′06″E
- Country: Poland
- Voivodeship: Masovian
- County: Wołomin
- Gmina: Tłuszcz
- Time zone: UTC+1 (CET)
  - Summer (DST): UTC+2 (CEST)

Stryjki [ˈstrɨi̯ki] is a village in the administrative district of Gmina Tłuszcz, within Wołomin County, Masovian Voivodeship, in east-central Poland.

Five Polish citizens were murdered by Nazi Germany in the village during World War II.
