= Jarzębia Łąka =

- Village
- Location within Poland
- Coordinates: 52°27′N 21°27′E
- Country: Poland
- Voivodeship: Masovian
- County: Wołomin
- Gmina: Tłuszcz
- Population: 570

Jarzębia Łąka [jaˈʐɛmbja ˈwɔnka] is a village in the administrative district of Gmina Tłuszcz, within Wołomin County, Masovian Voivodeship, in east-central Poland.
