= Szymanówek, Wołomin County =

Szymanówek
- Village
- Location within Poland
- Coordinates: 52°27′33″N 21°29′23″E
- Country: Poland
- Voivodeship: Masovian
- County: Wołomin
- Gmina: Tłuszcz

Szymanówek (Polish pronunciation: [ʂɨmaˈnuvɛk]) is a village in the administrative district of Gmina Tłuszcz, within Wołomin County, Masovian Voivodeship, in east-central Poland.
